= Charles Green (astronomer) =

18th-century British astronomer

Charles Green (baptised 26 December 1734 – 29 January 1771) was a British astronomer, noted for his assignment by the Royal Society in 1768 to the expedition sent to the Pacific Ocean in order to observe the transit of Venus aboard James Cook's Endeavour.

== Early life and education ==
Born sometime in December 1734, Green was the youngest son of Joshua Green, a prosperous farmer who lived near Swinton in South Yorkshire. His education, according to his future brother-in-law William Wales, was chiefly at a school near Denmark Street in Soho, London. This school was run by his eldest brother, the clergyman Rev. John Green, and the younger Green went on to become an assistant teacher there, continuing his studies in astronomy until he joined the staff of the Royal Greenwich Observatory in 1760.

== Career in astronomy ==
Green was appointed as Assistant to the Astronomer Royal, James Bradley, succeeding the astronomer Charles Mason who left to join the expedition to the Cape of Good Hope to observe the 1761 transit of Venus. Following Bradley's death in 1762, Green continued in the role of assistant for Bradley's successor Nathaniel Bliss. Due to the ill-health of Bliss, much of the work of practical observational astronomy devolved upon Green at this time.

In 1763, Green, along with the astronomer Nevil Maskelyne, was instructed by the Board of Longitude to make the voyage to Barbados to act as monitors of the test of John Harrison's H4 chronometer, which was in the running for the Longitude Prize, the prize offered by the British Government for the devisor of an accurate method of determining the longitude of a ship at sea. Their duties, after they arrived in Barbados and were awaiting the chronometer's arrival on another ship, involved observation of the Galilean moons of Jupiter to determine the local longitude, and after the arrival of the mechanism which was in the care of Harrison's son William, the comparison of the results of the chronometer with their astronomical observations to judge the mechanism's accuracy. On the voyage to Barbados, the pair were also using their observations to determine the accuracy of the lunar distance method, Maskelyne's own method of calculating the longitude of a ship at sea. An argument ensued between Maskelyne and William Harrison, which dragged in Green, as Harrison was of the opinion that Maskelyne was not an impartial observer and was a rival of his father in the pursuit of the Longitude Prize. A compromise was reached in which the monitoring of the Harrison mechanism was undertaken by Maskelyne and Green on alternate days.

Green's return to England in the autumn of 1764 coincided with the death of Nathaniel Bliss; Green returned to Greenwich to continue Bliss's work until the appointment of a new Astronomer Royal. The new Astronomer Royal proved to be Nevil Maskelyne. Green briefly served under him as assistant, but left Greenwich after a disagreement with his new superior. Wales' account says that Green was involved in a survey to determine the feasibility of transporting water from the River Colne to provide water to Marylebone in London, although Green's survey confirmed the fears of mill owners downstream that the canal would result in a failure of the water supply needed for their operations and led to the scheme being dropped. Although this is unmentioned in Wales's short biography, Green is recorded as being the purser on HMS Aurora in 1768. In that same year, the Royal Society appointed him to accompany James Cook's voyage to observe the 1769 transit of Venus; despite their earlier disagreement, Maskelyne who was serving on the Society's Transit of Venus Committee recommended his former assistant for the post.

== Voyage of the Endeavour and the Transit of Venus ==
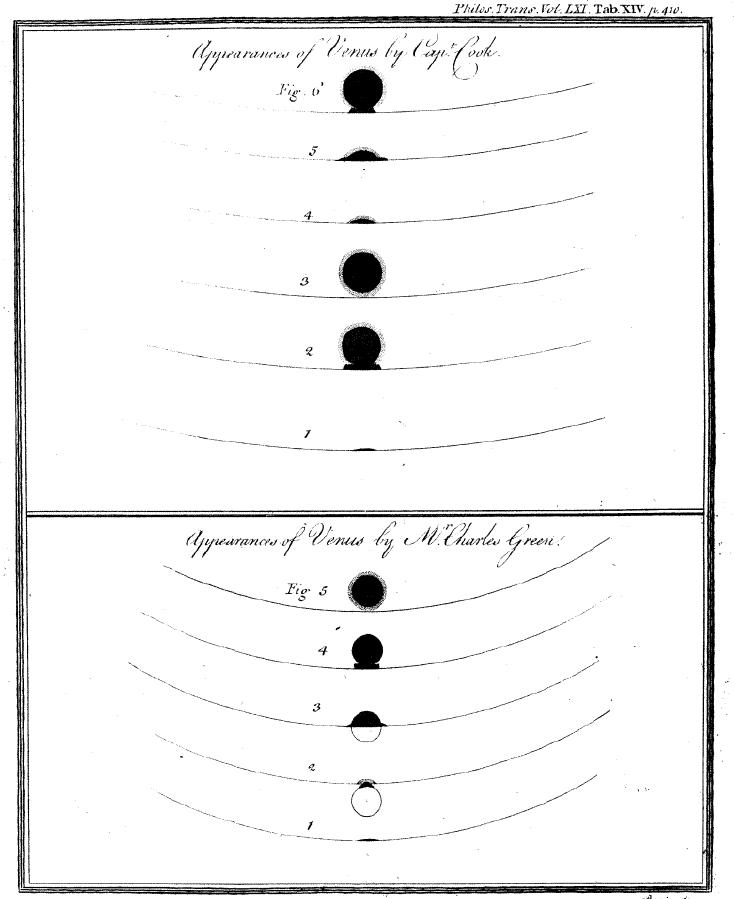
Sketchings of the 1769 Venus Transit by Captain James Cook and Charles Green, showing the black drop effect.

Green joined Cook's first voyage of circumnavigation in 1768, accompanied by a servant. Green was one of two official astronomers appointed by the Royal Society to observe the transit; the other was Cook himself, who was a capable observer in his own right. Green was to receive 200 guineas from the Society for the appointment. (Cook was to receive 100 guineas for his role in making the observations.) The Society provided instruments for the expedition, including two reflector telescopes built by James Short, two clocks and an astronomical quadrant; these were supplemented by a telescope in the possession of Daniel Solander and another provided by the Navy.

The expedition arrived at Tahiti, the chosen site for the observation of the transit, on 11 April 1769, anchoring in Matavai Bay on the north-western coast of the island two days later. A camp (Fort Venus) was established at Point Venus and the astronomical equipment was in place by the start of May. Of paramount importance for Green was the calculation of an accurate position of the location, which he calculated using the lunar distance method and by observation of the moons of Jupiter. The removal of the quadrant from the camp - either by the local Tahitians or by members of the expedition who traded it to the Tahitians - threatened to derail the enterprise, but it was soon recovered, albeit disassembled into pieces and with some damage, by the expedition botanist Joseph Banks, accompanied by Green.

The day of the transit, June 3, was a clear day and the transit was visible in its entirety. Although Cook had taken the precaution of sending two groups to outlying islands, the principal observation party remained at Fort Venus, where Green, Cook and (independently) Solander recorded the times of the transit. Cook noted in his log that the times recorded by the three observers for the times of contact differed significantly; this anomaly, now generally attributed to the black drop effect, would cast significant doubt, in the eyes of the Royal Society and Nevil Maskelyne, on the usefulness and value of the observations later.

=== Criticism of Green and his observations ===
Due to Green's death on the homeward voyage, the work of collating and analysing his results fell first to Cook, and ultimately to Nevil Maskelyne. Cook admitted that Green's papers were in a disorganised state, when he inspected them after Green's death, and that some of the timings were inconsistently recorded in various of the astronomer's papers. The Astronomer Royal was critical of Green's work, especially of the observations Green made to calculate the latitude and longitude of Fort Venus.

It has been noted that although the times for the contacts given by the three observers (Green, Cook and Solander) present at Fort Venus vary, they show no pattern of inconsistency attributable to one observer alone.

Wharton, in his "Sketch of Captain Cook's Life" in Captain Cook's Journal During His First Voyage Round the World, published 1893, gives special attention to the contribution of Green in the expedition. He states that "no doubt to him is due the major part of the determinations of accurate longitude, which is one of the very remarkable points of this voyage."

== Subsequent voyage of the Endeavour and the death of Green ==
Following the departure from Tahiti, the Endeavour continued south-westwards as Cook carried out his orders to further explore the Southern Ocean. The expedition reached New Zealand in October 1769, giving Green an opportunity to observe the transit of Mercury from land. A landing was made at an inlet that would be subsequently called Mercury Bay on 3 November; the transit was successfully observed by Green on November 9.

On reaching Australia, and during Cook's voyage along the coast, he named an island, Green Island, after the astronomer in June 1770. Green, by this time had contracted scurvy.

The Endeavour was forced to make for Batavia (present-day Jakarta) for repairs. Diseases were rife in the Dutch-controlled city, including malaria and dysentery; Green contracted the latter, dying on 29 January 1771, twelve days after the ship's departure from the port. Cook, in recording Green's death in his log, went on to add that Green had been in ill-health for some time and his lifestyle had contributed to his early death. An account published in a London newspaper described his final hours: "He had been ill some time, and was directed by the surgeon to keep himself warm, but in a fit of phrensy he got up in the night and put his legs out of the portholes, which was the occasion of his death."

== Personal life ==
Green married Elizabeth Long in March 1768 in London; the records of the Royal Society mention making a provision of £50 per annum for his wife for the duration of the expedition. Green's sister Mary married the astronomer William Wales, who was part of a Royal Society expedition to Hudson Bay to observe the 1769 transit of Venus and who replaced Green for Cook's next voyage.

== See also ==
- 1769 Transit of Venus observed from Tahiti
- First voyage of James Cook
- European and American voyages of scientific exploration
