= USS Endeavor (AFDL-1) =

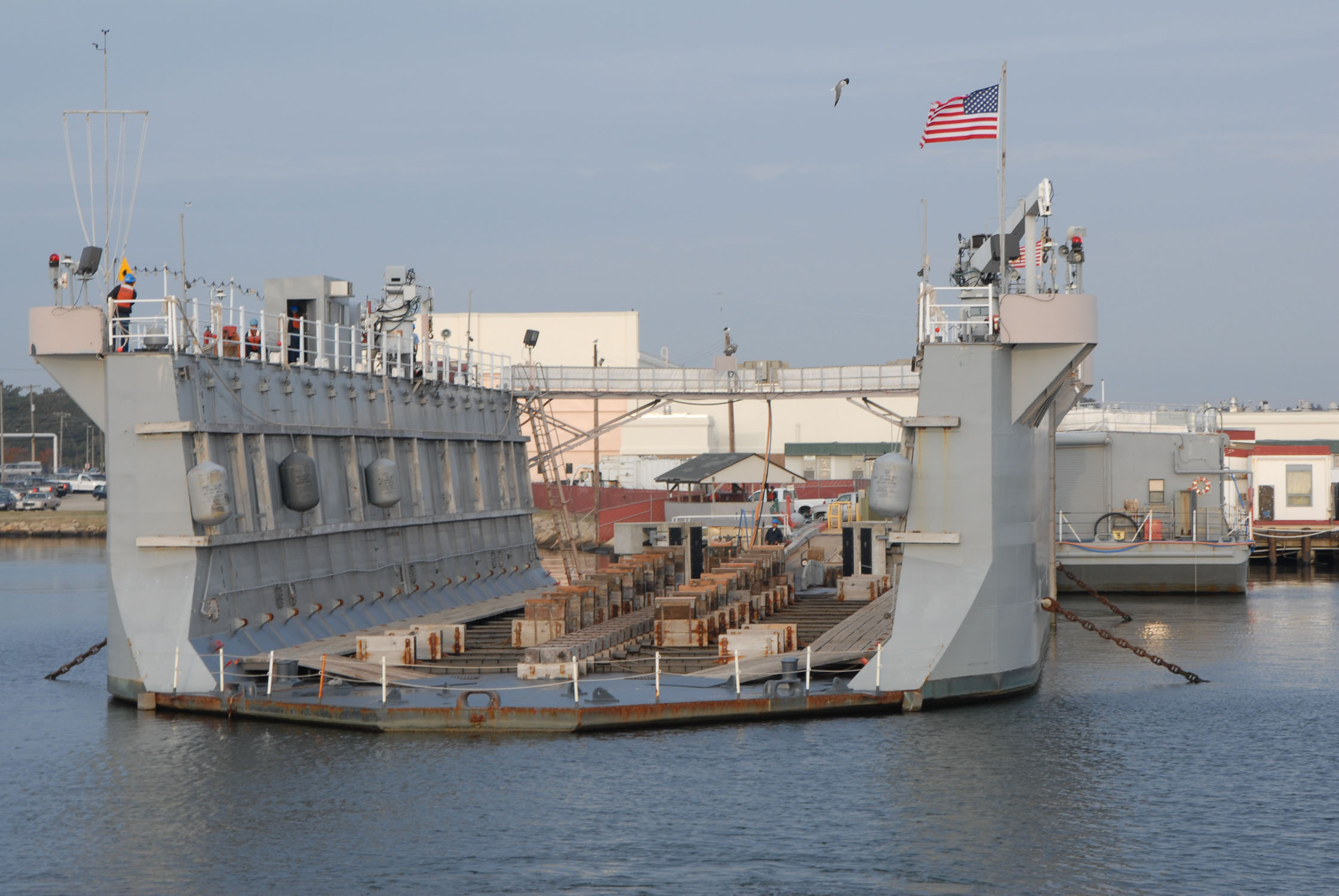
- Sister ship of USS Endeavor AFDL-1, the USS Dynamic AFDL-6

History

United States
- Name: USS Endeavor AFDL-1
- Builder: Chicago Bridge and Iron
- Acquired: September 1943
- Commissioned: September 1943
- In service: 1943
- Fate: Sold to Dominican Republic in 1986
- Status: In Active Service
- Notes: Ship International Radio Callsign: NFKD

General characteristics
- Class & type: AFDL-1-Class
- Displacement: 800 tons
- Length: 200 feet
- Beam: 64 feet (inside width 45 feet)
- Draft: 3 ft 3 in (0.99 m) (light), 31 ft 4 in (9.55 m) (flooded)
- Propulsion: none - towed
- Armament: none
- Notes: Lifting Capacity: 1,900 tons

USS Endeavor was a 200-foot AFDL-1 Class Small Auxiliary floating drydock in service with the United States Navy during World War II. Built and delivered by Chicago Bridge and Iron in Morgan City, Louisiana in September 1943, she entered service as USS AFD-1. She was redesignated AFDL-1 on 1 August 1946. In 1986, she was decommissioned, struck from the Naval Register and transferred to the Dominican Republic and redesignated DF-1. She is currently in Active Service as of 2017.

It also shares the name with the Endeavour space shuttle, an orbital space vehicle used by NASA as an active participant in the construction of the International Space Station. Both vessels use the British English spelling of the word, rather than the American English form, in honor of the British HMS Endeavour, the ship of Captain James Cook on his first voyage of discovery (1768–1771).

== Awards ==
- American Campaign Medal
- World War II Victory Medal
- National Defense Service Medal with star

== See also ==
- USS Ability (AFDL-7)
