= First voyage of James Cook =

Combined Royal Navy and Royal Society expedition to the south Pacific

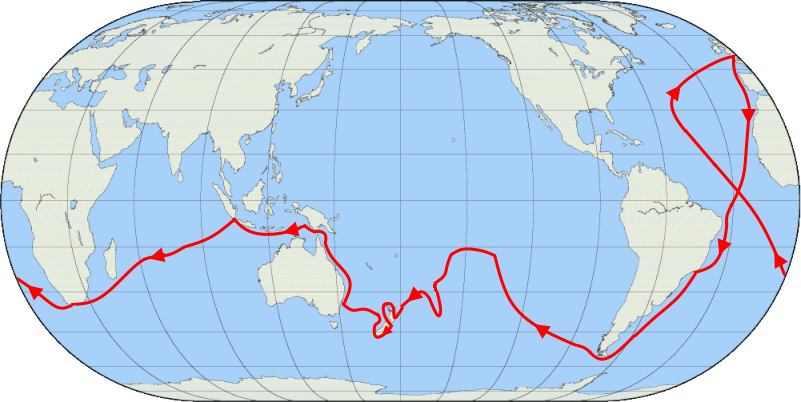
The route of Cook's first voyage

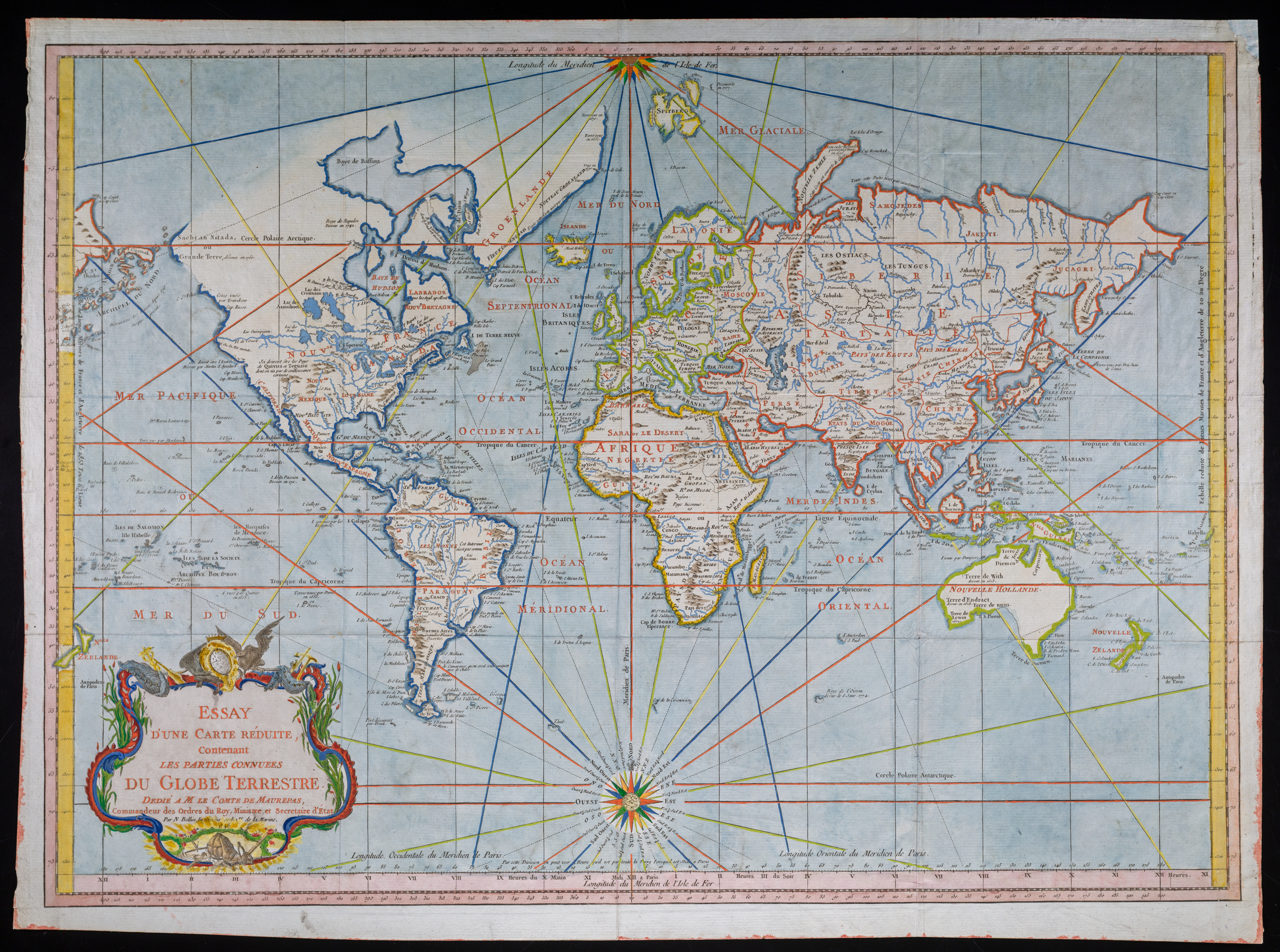
Map published sometime after 1771. The original 1748 version of the map has been revised to show the discoveries of Cook's first voyage (1768-1771) and discoveries in Bering Strait.

The first voyage of James Cook was a combined Royal Navy and Royal Society expedition to the south Pacific Ocean aboard HMS Endeavour, from 1768 to 1771. The aims were to observe the 1769 transit of Venus from Tahiti and to seek evidence of the postulated Terra Australis Incognita or "undiscovered southern land". It was the first of three voyages of which Cook was the commander.

Cook was chosen to lead the voyage based on his skills in cartography and mathematics. Departing from Plymouth Dockyard in August 1768 the expedition crossed the Atlantic, rounded Cape Horn and reached Tahiti in April 1769, before the expected transit on 3 June. After the observation, Cook stopped at the nearby islands of Huahine, Borabora and Raiatea to claim them for Great Britain before sailing into the largely uncharted ocean to the south and west. In October, the expedition reached New Zealand; Cook was only the second European to visit there, following the first voyage of Abel Tasman 127 years earlier. Cook and his crew spent the following six months charting the New Zealand coast, before resuming their voyage westward across open sea. In April 1770 they became the first known Europeans to reach the east coast of Australia, making landfall near present-day Point Hicks, and then proceeding north to Botany Bay.

The expedition continued northward along the Australian coastline, narrowly avoiding shipwreck on the Great Barrier Reef. In October 1770 the badly damaged Endeavour came into the port of Batavia in the Dutch East Indies, her crew sworn to secrecy about the lands they had discovered. They resumed their journey on 26 December, rounded the Cape of Good Hope on 13 March 1771, and reached the English port of Deal on 12 July. The voyage lasted almost three years.

The year following his return, Cook left on a second circumnavigation (1772 to 1775), again in search of Terra Australis.

== Conception ==
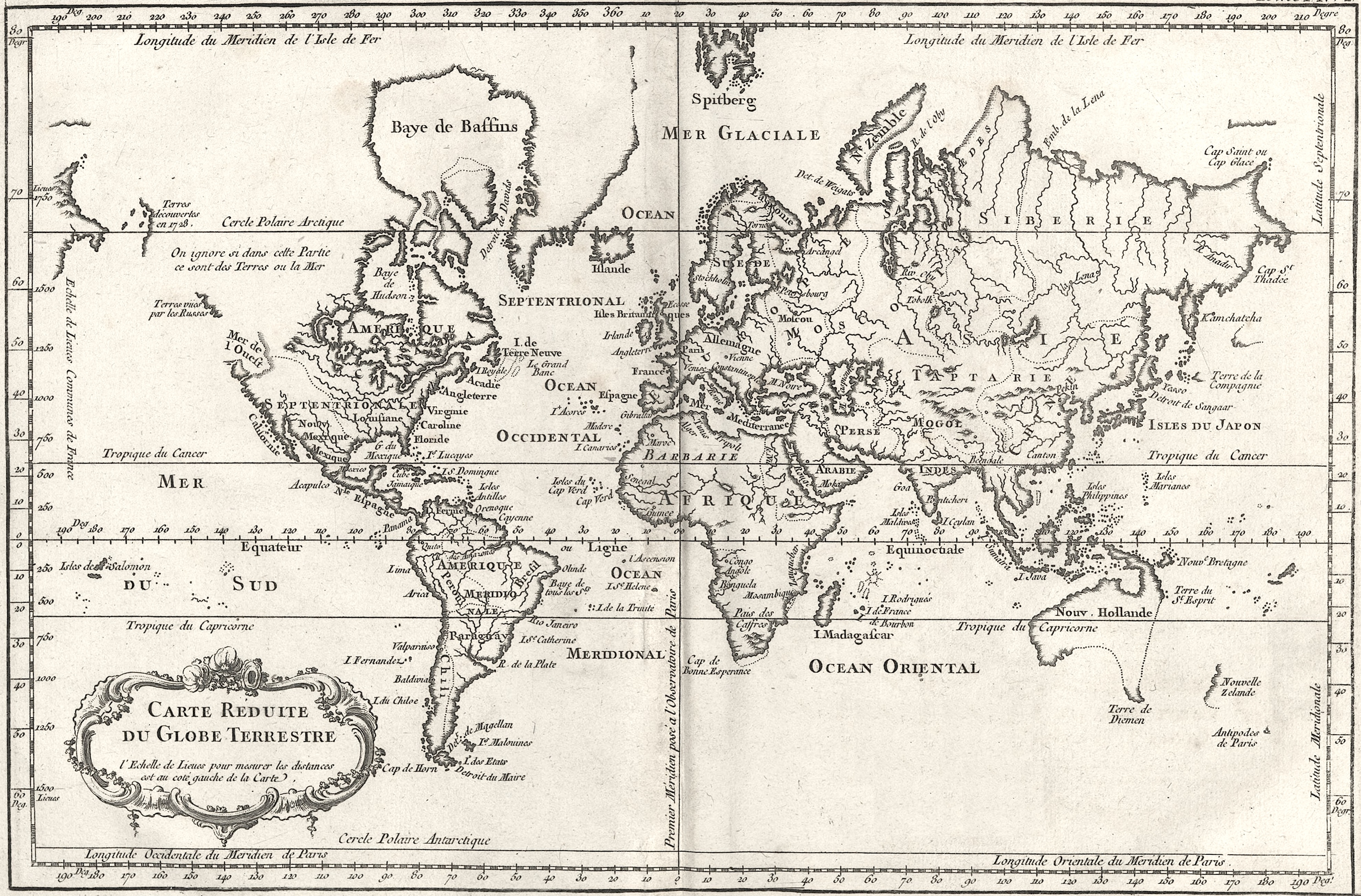
This 1764 map of the world, by French hydrographer Jacques-Nicolas Bellin, shows the major landmasses known to Europeans in the 1760s. Unknown areas included Alaska, the east coast of Australia, and the west coast of Canada.

On 16 February 1768 the Royal Society petitioned King George III to finance a scientific expedition to the Pacific to study and observe the 1769 transit of Venus across the face of the sun to enable the measurement of the distance from the Earth to the Sun. Royal approval was granted for the expedition, and the Admiralty elected to combine the scientific voyage with a confidential mission to search the south Pacific for signs of the postulated continent Terra Australis Incognita (or "unknown southern land"). The aims of the expedition were revealed in the press: "To-morrow morning Mr. Banks, Dr. Solano [sic], with Mr. Green, the Astronomer, will set out for Deal, to embark on board Endeavour, Capt. Cook, for the South Seas, under the direction of the Royal Society, to observe the Transit of Venus next summer, and to make discoveries to the South and West of Cape Horn". The London Gazetteer was more explicit when it reported on 18 August 1768: "The gentlemen, who are to sail in a few days for George's Land, the new discovered island in the Pacific ocean, with an intention to observe the Transit of Venus, are likewise, we are credibly informed, to attempt some new discoveries in that vast unknown tract, above the latitude 40". Another article reported that "the principal and almost sole national advantage" of the island discovered by Captain Wallace, that is Tahiti, was "its situation for exploring the Terra Incognita of the Southern Hemisphere", and that, "The Endeavour, a North-Country Cat, is purchased by the Government, and commanded by a Lieutenant of the Navy; she is fitting out at Deptford for the South Sea, thought to be intended for the newly discovered island." The Gazette de France of 20 June 1768 reported that the British Admiralty was outfitting two sloops of war to go to "the newly discovered island", from where they would "essay the discovery of the Southern Continent".

The Royal Society suggested command be given to Scottish geographer Alexander Dalrymple, who had urged that an expedition be sent to make contact with the estimated 50 million inhabitants of the Southern Continent with whom, he said, there was "at present no trade from Europe thither, though the scraps from this table would be sufficient to maintain the power, dominion, and sovereignty of Britain, by employing all its manufacturers and ships". As a condition of his acceptance, Dalrymple demanded a brevet commission as a captain in the Royal Navy. However, First Lord of the Admiralty Edward Hawke refused, going so far as to say he would rather cut off his right hand than give command of a Navy vessel to someone not educated as a seaman. In refusing Dalrymple's command, Hawke was influenced by previous insubordination aboard the sloop HMS Paramour in 1698, when naval officers had refused to take orders from civilian commander Edmond Halley. The impasse was broken when the Admiralty proposed James Cook, a naval officer with a background in mathematics and cartography. Acceptable to both parties, Cook took and passed the examination for Lieutenant, so allowing him to take command of Endeavour, and of the expedition.

== Preparations and personnel ==
=== Vessel provisions and Instruments ===
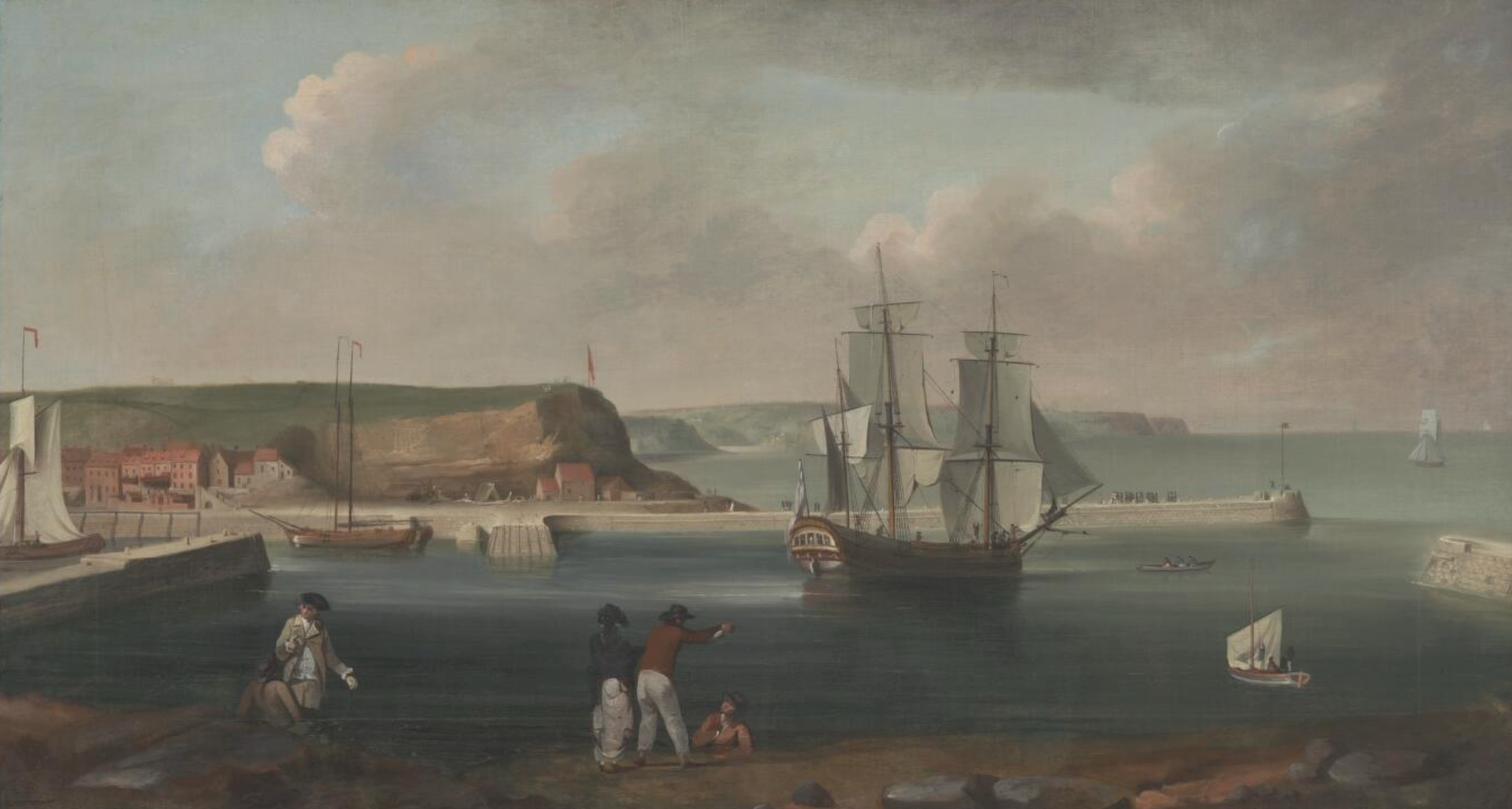
Earl of Pembroke, later HMS Endeavour, leaving Whitby Harbour in 1768. By Thomas Luny, dated 1790

The vessel chosen by the Admiralty for the voyage was a merchant collier named Earl of Pembroke, launched in June 1764 from the coal and whaling port of Whitby in North Yorkshire. She was ship-rigged and sturdily built with a broad, flat bow, a square stern and a long box-like body with a deep hold. A flat-bottomed design made her well-suited to sailing in shallow waters and allowed her to be beached for loading and unloading of cargo. Her length was 106 feet (32 m), with a beam of 29 feet 3 inches (8.92 m), and measuring 368 71/94 tons burthen. Earl of Pembroke was purchased by the Admiralty in May 1768 for £2,840 10s 11d (Note: In today's terms, this equates to a valuation for Endeavour of approximately £265,000 and a purchase price of £326,400.) and sailed to Deptford on the River Thames to be prepared for the voyage. Her hull was sheathed and caulked, and a third internal deck installed to provide cabins, a powder magazine and storerooms. A longboat, pinnace and yawl were provided as ship's boats, as well as a set of 28 ft (8.5 m) sweeps to allow the ship to be rowed if becalmed or demasted. After commissioning into the Royal Navy as His Majesty's Bark the Endeavour, the ship was supplied with ten 4-pounder cannons and twelve swivel guns, for defence against native attack while in the Pacific.

Provisions loaded at the outset of the voyage included 6,000 pieces of pork and 4,000 of beef, nine tons of bread, five tons of flour, three tons of sauerkraut, one ton of raisins and sundry quantities of cheese, salt, peas, oil, sugar and oatmeal. Alcohol supplies consisted of 250 barrels of beer, 44 barrels of brandy and 17 barrels of rum. The livestock included a goat that had already travelled around the world with Samuel Wallis.

For the various scientific investigations, there were 2 reflecting telescopes with a focal length of 60 cm, 2 wooden tripods for the telescopes with equatorial polar axes, an astronomical quadrant with a radius of 30 cm, an astronomical clock, a brass sextant, a barometer, a control clock, 2 thermometers, 1 stand for the quadrant, a diving needle, an azimuth compass and a portable observatory. In addition to these instruments, Cook requested and received mathematical and surveying equipment, including a theodolite and a measuring table, a pair of brass scales, a pair of proportional compasses, glass for tracing, and paper and paints for determining the ship's position and mapping land.

=== Instructions ===
Cook's first task was to sail to King George Island (Tahiti) and find a suitable place to observe the transit of Venus. After observing the transit of Venus, Cook was to sail south to find the suspected unknown southern continent. If there were no signs of a continent, he was to seek out the eastern side of New Zealand. If the continent was indeed discovered, Cook was to explore as much of the coast as he could; he was to record the true position of the coast in both latitude and longitude, the variation of the compass needle, the orientation of the headlands, the height, direction and course of the tides and currents, the depth of the sea, shoals, rocks and cliffs, and take views of bays, harbours and parts of the coast that might be useful for navigation. In addition, he should take possession of uninhabited land, study the flora and fauna of the area and take samples of all his findings, as well as seek friendly contact with the natives. The Admiralty's Instructions do not mention the half-mapped fifth continent of New Holland (as Australia was known in the eighteenth century).

=== Navigation ===
Cook's career covered the time when practical solutions were being developed for the longitude problem. (Latitude had been determined by seafarers since the end of the 15th century, using the astrolabe and later the quadrant to measure the altitude of the sun at noon.) Calculation of longitude required knowledge of the time at a fixed reference meridian (the Greenwich meridian is the one that became the accepted standard). When Cook was appointed to command his first voyage of exploration, Samuel Wallis was returning from his exploration of the Pacific. The purser of his ship, John Harrison (Note: This is not the same John Harrison who developed the chronometer.) had the necessary skills and astronomical tables to use the lunar distance method of working out the time at a reference point and, using local time, work out the longitude. (Wallis himself admitted that the necessary mathematics were too complex for him.) This meant that Wallis's position of Tahiti gave both the latitude and longitude of this island, so Cook should have no trouble finding the island.

Cook was equipped with advance copies of the tables in the nautical almanac for 1768 and 1769, providing pre-calculated steps for the lunar distance method. These substantially shortened the mathematics, compared to that used on Wallis's voyage – four hours of calculations was now reduced to one hour. When the tables ran out at the end of 1769, Cook had to revert to the longer process. The officers and many of the petty officers of Discovery learnt how to take the observations of lunar distance, with several taking sights at the same time whenever the astronomical conditions were appropriate. This even continued when the ship was in peril, with good measurements taken on 17 August 1770, whilst the rest of the crew were struggling to save the ship from being driven into breaking waves on a reef.

=== Ship's company ===
On 30 July 1768 the Admiralty authorised a ship's company for the voyage, of 73 sailors and 12 Royal Marines. The voyage was commanded by 40-year-old Lieutenant James Cook. His second lieutenant was Zachary Hicks, a 29-year-old from Stepney in London with experience as acting commander of HMS Hornet, a 16-gun cutter. The third lieutenant was John Gore, a 16-year Naval veteran who had served as master's mate aboard HMS Dolphin during its circumnavigation of the world in 1766.

Other notable people on the expedition included the official astronomer, Charles Green, then assistant to the Astronomer Royal, Nevil Maskelyne. Joseph Banks had been appointed to the voyage as the official botanist. Banks funded seven others to join him: a Swedish naturalist Daniel Solander, a Finnish naturalist Herman Spöring, two artists (Alexander Buchan and Sydney Parkinson), a scientific secretary, and two black servants from his estate.

== Voyage of discovery ==
=== Voyage from Plymouth to Tahiti ===
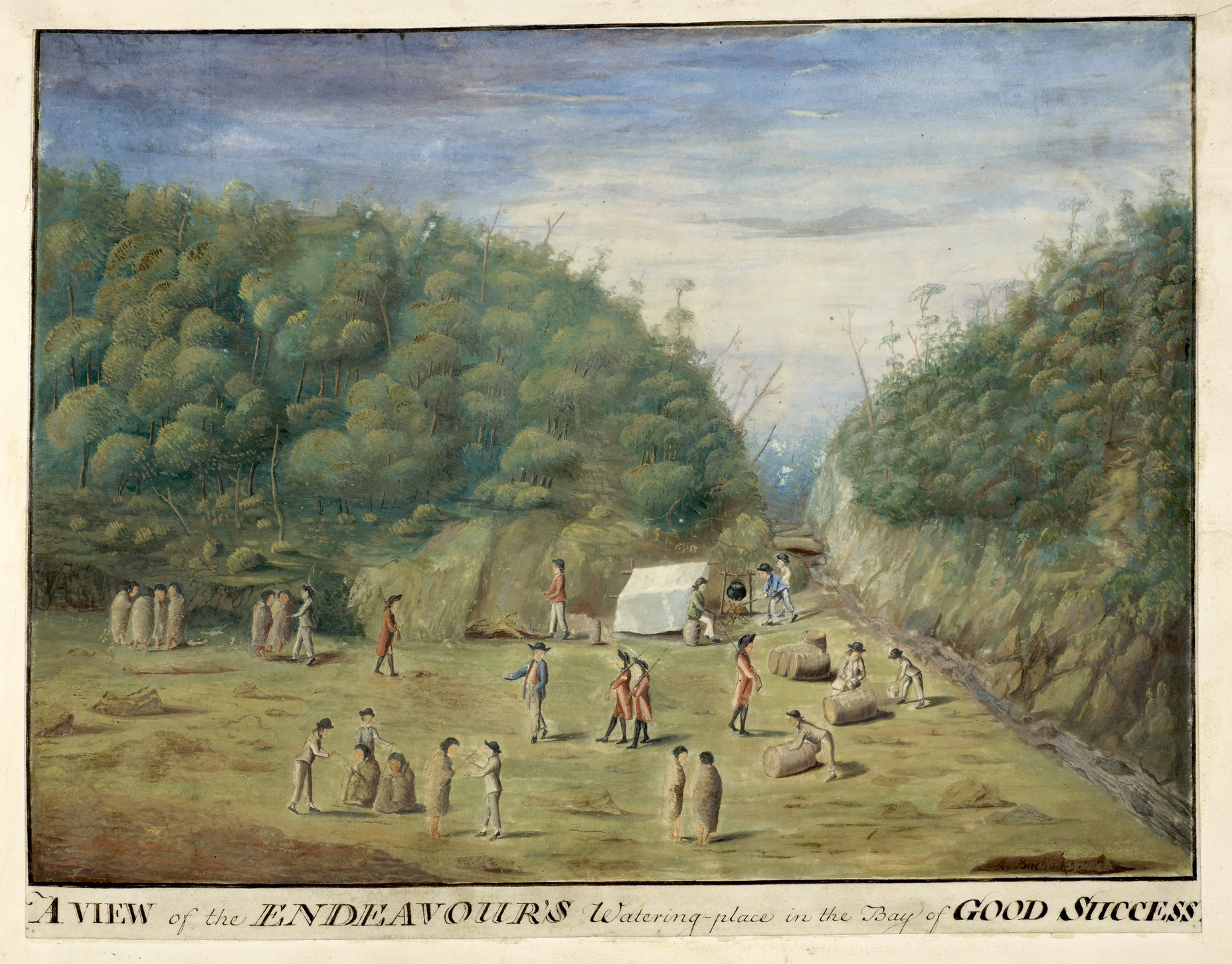
View of Endeavour's watering place in the Bay of Good Success, Tierra del Fuego, with natives. Alexander Buchan, January 1769.

Cook departed from Plymouth on 26 August 1768, carrying 94 people and 18 months of provisions. On 15 November, Endeavour reached Rio de Janeiro and stayed there until 2 December, re-provisioning and making repairs. The Viceroy, the Marques de Azambuja, had been warned by his home government that Britain was seeking to extend its overseas power and influence following its victory in the Seven Years' War, and therefore suspected that the observation of the transit of Venus and study of natural history that Cook told him were the aims of his voyage were not its only or main objectives. Cook took offence at the Viceroy's suspicious attitude. In his journal, he described Guanabara Bay, including its defensive fortifications, and noted that the city could be taken by a force of six ships of the line. The ship rounded Cape Horn and continued westward across the Pacific to arrive at Matavai Bay, Tahiti on 13 April 1769, where the observations were to be made. The transit was going to occur on 3 June, and in the meantime Cook commissioned the building of a small fort and observatory at what is now known as Point Venus.

=== Transit of Venus ===
The astronomer appointed to the task was Charles Green, assistant to the recently appointed Astronomer Royal, Nevil Maskelyne. The primary purpose of the observation was to obtain measurements that could be used to calculate more accurately the distance of Venus from the Sun. If this could be achieved, then the distances of the other planets could be worked out, and eventually the distance between any two points on Earth, thus solving the problem of accurately establishing longitude. On the day of the transit observation, Cook recorded:

Saturday 3^{rd} This day prov'd as favourable to our purpose as we could wish, not a Clowd was to be seen the Whole day and the Air was perfectly clear, so that we had every advantage we could desire in Observing the whole of the passage of the Planet Venus over the Suns disk: we very distinctly saw an Atmosphere or dusky shade round the body of the Planet which very much disturbed the times of the contacts particularly the two internal ones. D^{r} Solander observed as well as M^{r} Green and my self, and we differ'd from one another in observeing the times of the Contacts much more than could be expected.

Disappointingly, the separate measurements of Green, Cook and Solander varied by more than the anticipated margin of error. Their instrumentation was adequate by the standards of the time, but the resolution still could not eliminate the errors. When their results were later compared to those of the other observations of the same event made elsewhere for the exercise, the net result was not as conclusive or accurate as had been hoped. The difficulties are today thought to relate to various optical phenomena (including the Black drop effect), that precluded accurate measurement – particularly with the instruments used by Cook, Green and Solander.

=== Society Islands and southern continent ===
Once the observations were completed, Cook opened the sealed orders for the second part of his voyage: to search the south Pacific for signs of the postulated southern continent of Terra Australis. The Royal Society, and especially Alexander Dalrymple, believed that Terra Australis must exist, and that Britain's best chance of discovering and claiming it before any rival European power would be by using Cook's Transit of Venus mission.

Cook, however, decided to first explore the other nearby islands. A local priest and mariner named Tupaia volunteered to join him, and was to prove invaluable as a pilot, interpreter and intermediary between the crew of Endeavour and local inhabitants. Endeavour left Tahiti on 13 July and entered the harbour of the nearby island of Huahine on 16 July. There Cook gave to Oree, the chief, an inscribed plate "as lasting a Testimony of our having first discover'd this island as any we could leave behind". From Huahine Cook sailed to the neighbouring island of Raiatea where, on 20 July, he raised the flag and claimed Raiatea-Tahaa and the "adjacent" islands of Huahine, Borabora, Tupai (Motu Iti) and Maurua (Maupiti) for Great Britain, naming them the Society Islands "as they lay contiguous to one another".

On 9 August, Cook weighed anchor and, following Admiralty instructions, sailed south in search of the southern continent. In early September, after a journey of some 2400 kilometres, Endeavour reached the latitude of 40 degrees south without sighting the supposed continent. In accordance with his instructions, Cook then turned west and headed towards New Zealand, keeping a course between a latitude of approximately 29 degrees and 40 degrees south.

== New Zealand ==
=== Initial contacts with Māori ===
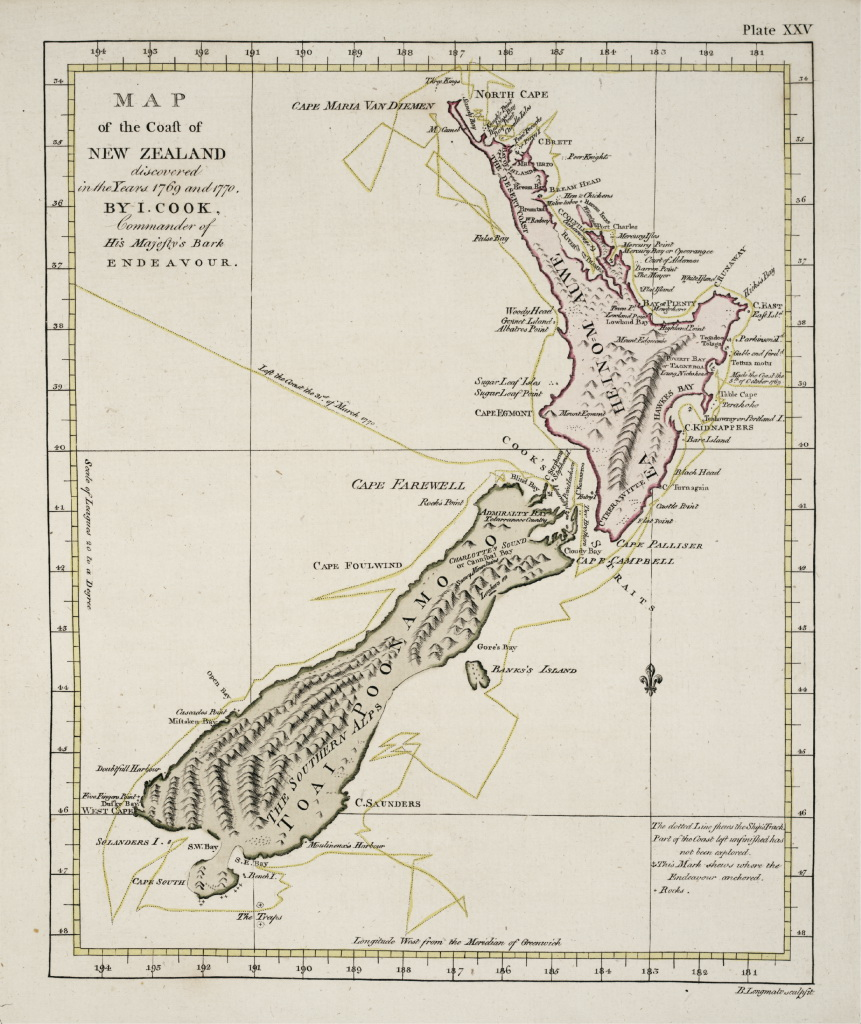
Cook's map of New Zealand

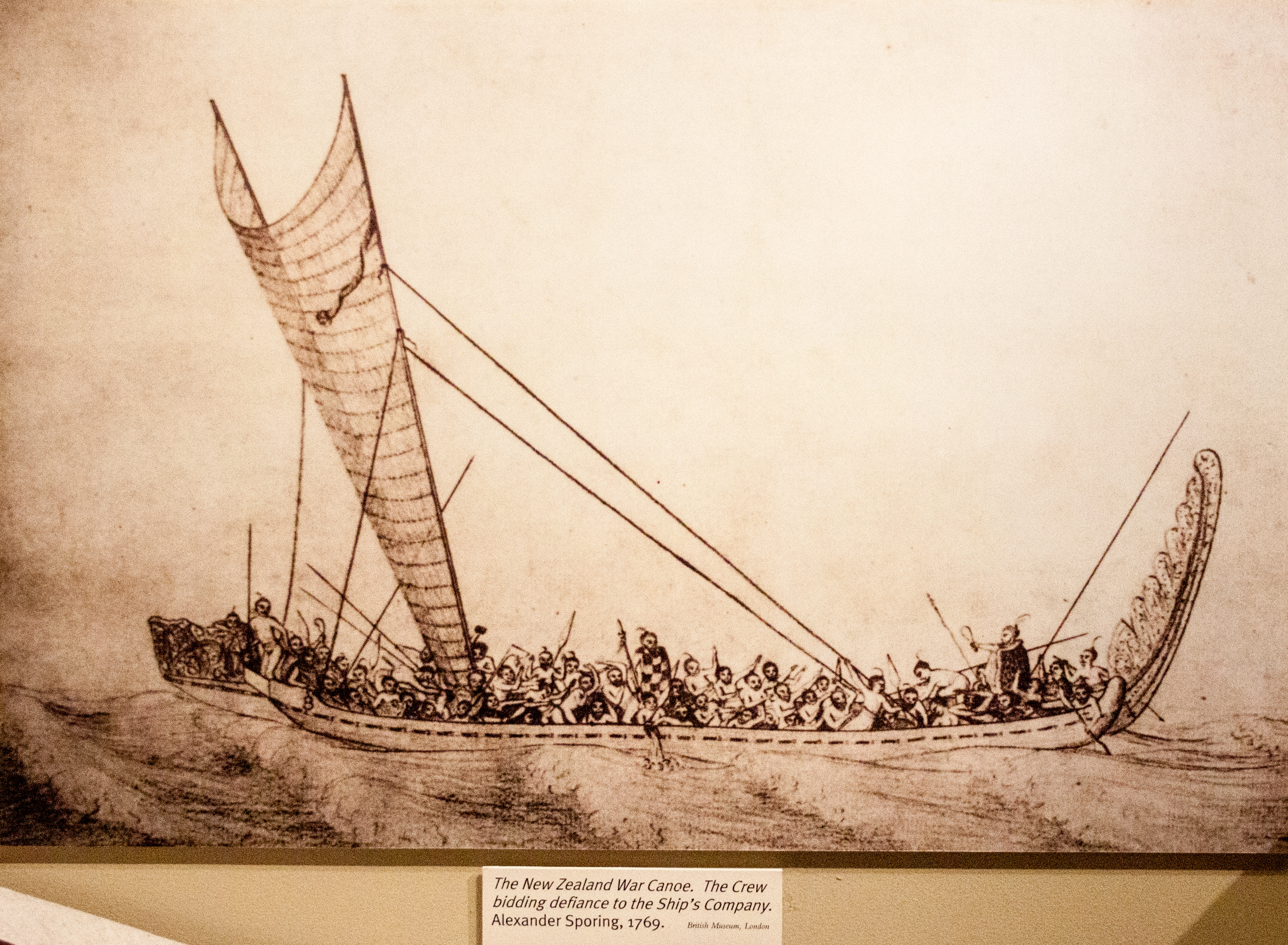
Māori war canoe with triangle sail drawn by Herman Spöring during Cook's first voyage to New Zealand in 1769

Cook reached New Zealand on 6 October 1769, leading only the second group of Europeans known to do so (after Abel Tasman over a century earlier, in 1642). Cook and a landing party arrived onshore on 7 October at Poverty Bay in the north-east of the North Island. Over the first two days of arriving onshore, the first encounters with Māori resulted in the death of four or five locals. Three more Māori were killed in an encounter farther south off Cape Kidnappers on 15 October. Cook's journal entries reflect regret as he had failed his instructions to avoid hostilities with the Indigenous people of any nations encountered. Further encounters with Māori at Anaura Bay and Tolaga Bay were more peaceful, with Tupaia (who understood the Māori language) playing an important role as interpreter and mediator between the parties. The Māori traded freely with the British and allowed them to gather water, wild celery and scurvy grass.

=== Mercury Bay ===
Sailing north, Endeavour next anchored at Mercury Bay where Cook observed the transit of Mercury on 9 November. Relations with the Māori were generally peaceful, although one local was killed in a trading dispute. This was the last recorded death of a Māori at the hands of Cook's crew. After raising the flag and formally claiming possession of Mercury Bay for Great Britain, Cook sailed Endeavour out of the bay on 15 November.

=== Circumnavigation of the North Island ===
Continuing north, Cook anchored at Bream Head and then the Bay of Islands, before rounding North Cape in the face of strong gales, narrowly missing an encounter with Surville's French expedition in the St Jean Baptiste, which was rounding the cape at the same time in the opposite direction. On 6 January 1770, the gales abated and Cook was able to make good progress down the west coast of the North Island without landing onshore. By mid-January, Cook arrived in Queen Charlotte Sound, on the north coast of New Zealand's South Island, a location he would favour in his second and third voyages.

Cook led an excursion to nearby Arapawa Island on 22 January, where he climbed Kaitapeha Peak and saw the strait (which he named Cook Strait) separating the North Island of New Zealand from the South Island. The existence of the strait proved that the North Island was not part of the supposed southern continent.

On 31 January, Cook claimed possession of Queen Charlotte Sound "and the adjacent lands" in the name of King George III. This was the last time Cook would claim possession of any part of New Zealand on behalf of Great Britain. The Endeavour sailed out of the sound on 5 February, and passing through Cook Strait, turned north, allowing Cook to chart the coast from Cape Palliser to Cape Turnagain. This completed the circumnavigation of the North island.

=== Circumnavigation of the South Island ===
Turning south, Cook sailed down the east coast of the South Island, charting the coast and continuing the search for the southern continent. The Endeavour rounded South Cape on 10 March, proving, even to southern continent enthusiasts such as Banks, that the South Island was not the sought-after sixth continent.

Cook continued north along the west coast of the South Island without landing, before re-entering Cook Strait and turning into Admiralty Bay on 27 March. The circumnavigation of southern New Zealand had been completed.

=== Foveaux Strait ===
With patience Cook had mapped a land almost as large as Italy, making only two major mapping errors, both in the South Island. Through lack of time, he mistakenly thought that Banks Peninsula was an island and he thought Stewart Island, at the very south, was a peninsula.

Margaret Cameron-Ash claims Cook knew that a strait separated Stewart Island from the mainland, but hid his discovery for reasons of military and colonial policy. G. A. Mawer, however, agrees with Geoffrey Blainey that it is more likely that Cook simply made an error, as his focus was on finding the southern extent of New Zealand, and conditions were unfavourable for more closely exploring the possible strait.

=== Instructions fulfilled ===
Cook wrote in his journal on 31 March 1770 that Endeavour's voyage "must be allowed to have set aside the most, if not all, the Arguments and proofs that have been advanced by different Authors to prove that there must be a Southern Continent; I mean to the Northward of 40 degrees South, for what may lie to the Southward of that Latitude I know not".

On the same day he recorded his decision to set a course to return home by way of the yet unknown east coast of New Holland (as Australia was then called):

being now resolv'd to quit this Country altogether, and to bend my thought towards returning home by such a rout as might Conduce most to the Advantage of the Service I am upon, I consulted with the Officers upon the most Eligible way of putting this in Execution. To return by the way of Cape Horn was what I most wished because by this route we should have been able to prove the Existance or Non-Existance of a Southern Continent, which yet remains Doubtfull; but in order to Ascertain this we must have kept in a higher Latitude in the very Depth of Winter, but the Condition of the Ship, in every respect, was not thought sufficient for such an undertaking. For the same reason, the thoughts of proceeding directly to the Cape of Good Hope was laid aside, especially as no discovery of any Moment could be hoped for in that rout. It was therefore resolved to return by way of the East Indies by the following rout: upon Leaving this Coast to steer to the Westward until we fall in with the East Coast of New Holland, and then to follow the direction of that Coast to the Northward, or what other direction it might take us until we arrive at its Northern extremity; and if this should be found impracticable, then to Endeavour to fall in with the Land or Islands discovered by Quiros.

A voyage to explore the east coast of New Holland, with a view to the British colonisation of the country, had been recommended in John Campbell's editions of John Harris's Navigantium atque Itinerantium Bibliotheca, or Voyages and Travels (1744–1748, and 1764), a book which Cook had with him on Endeavour:

The first Point, with respect to a Discovery, would be, to send a small Squadron on the Coast of Van Diemen's Land, and from thence round, in the same course taken by Captain Tasman, by the Coast of New Guiney; which might enable the Nations that attempted it, to come to an absolute Certainty with regard to its Commodities and Commerce... By this means all the back Coast of New Holland, and New Guiney, might be roughly examined; and we might know as well, and as certainly, as the Dutch, how far a Colony settled there might answer our Expectations.

Cook's maps of the North and South Islands
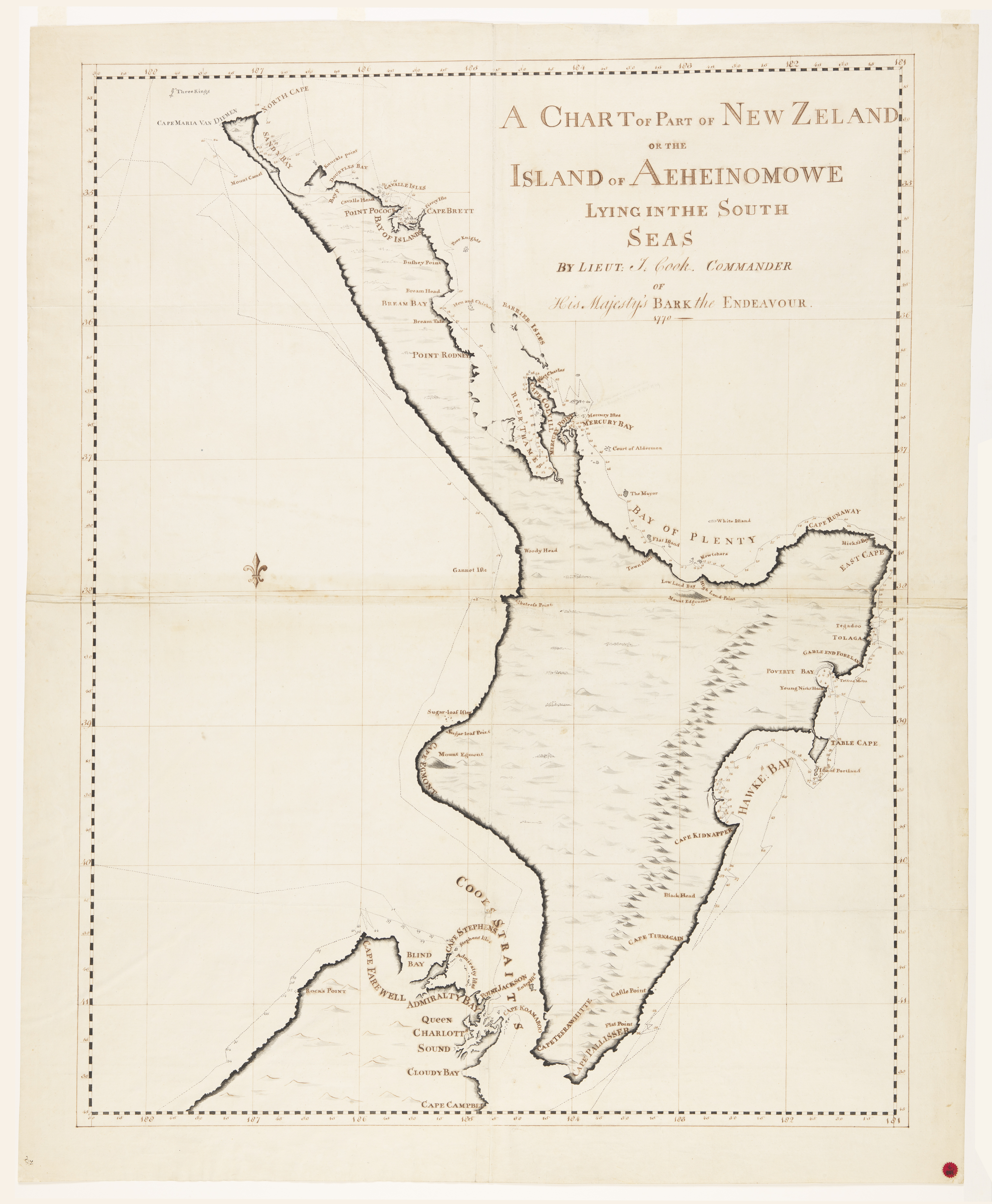
Manuscript nautical chart of the North Island of New Zealand, prepared during James Cook's first voyage, 1768–1771

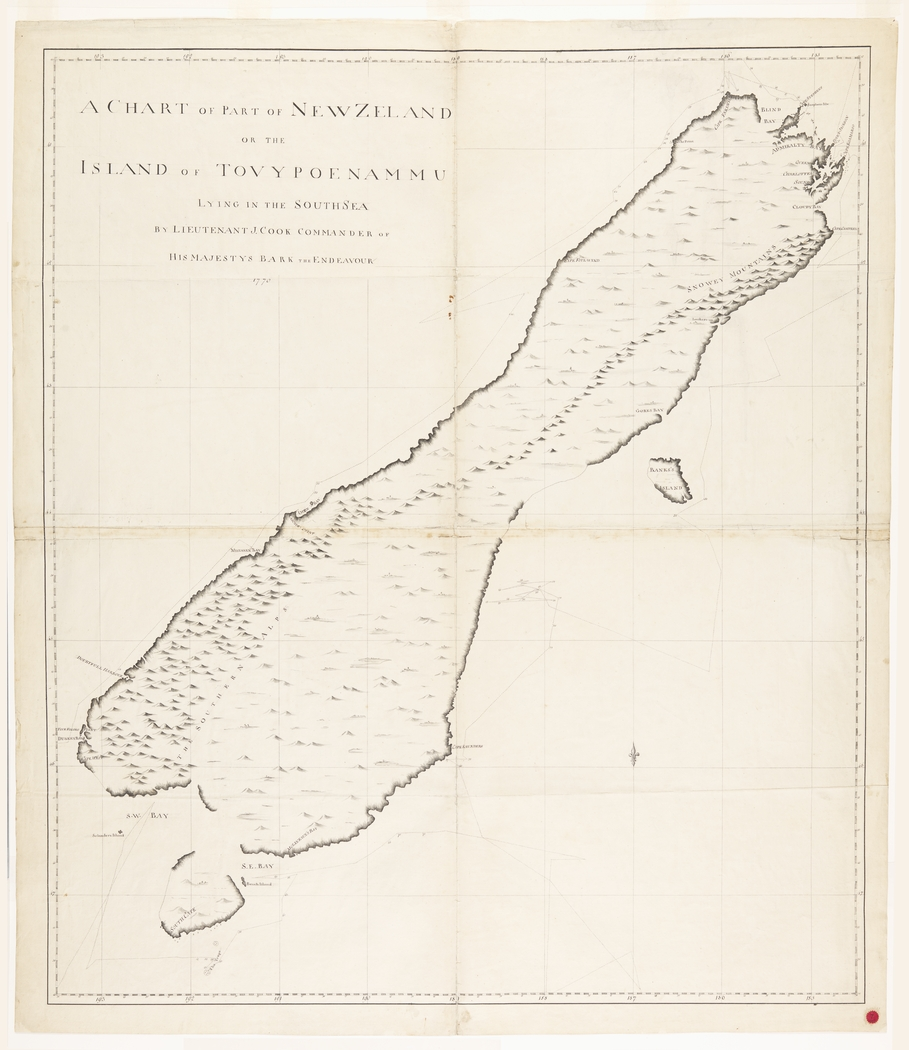
Manuscript nautical chart of the South Island of New Zealand prepared during James Cook's first voyage, 1768–1771

== Australian coast ==
Cook then set course westwards, intending to strike for Van Diemen's Land (present-day Tasmania, sighted by Tasman) to establish whether or not it formed part of the fabled southern continent. However, they were forced to maintain a more northerly course owing to prevailing gales, and sailed on until 19 April 1770 when land was sighted at 6 a.m. After further observation, Cook named the land Point Hicks, after the officer who first sighted land. This point was on the south-eastern coast of the Australian continent, and therefore Cook's expedition became the first recorded Europeans to have encountered its eastern coastline (though previous Dutch explorers had mapped the north, west and much of the south coast). In his journal, Cook recorded the event thus:

the Southermost[sic] Point of land we had in sight which bore from us W1/4S I judged to lay in the Latitude of 38°..0' S° and in the Longitude of 211°..07' W^{t} from the Meridian of Greenwich. I have named it Point Hicks, because Lieut^{t} Hicks was the first who discover'd this land.

Cook calculated that Van Diemen's Land ought to lie due south of their position, but having found the coastline trending to the south-west, recorded his doubt that this landmass was connected to it.

The landmark of this sighting is generally reckoned to be a point lying about half-way between the present-day towns of Orbost and Mallacoota on the south-eastern coast of the state of Victoria. A survey done in 1843 ignored or overlooked Cook's earlier naming of the point, giving it the name Cape Everard. On the 200th anniversary of the sighting, the name was officially changed back to Point Hicks. Nevertheless, it is likely that Cook's "Point of land" was somewhat to the south-west of today's Point Hicks.

The ship's log recorded that land was sighted at 6 a.m. on Thursday 19 April 1770. Cook's log used the nautical date, which, during the 18th century, assigned the same date to all ship's events from noon to noon, first p.m. and then a.m. That nautical date began twelve hours before the midnight beginning of the like-named civil date. Furthermore, Cook did not adjust his nautical date to account for circumnavigation of the globe until he had travelled a full 360° relative to the longitude of his home British port, either toward the east or west. Because he travelled west on his first voyage, this a.m. nautical date was the morning of a civil date 14 hours slow relative to his home port (port−14h). Because the south-east coast of Australia is now regarded as being 10 hours ahead relative to Britain, that date is now called Friday, 20 April.

=== Botany Bay and initial contacts with Aboriginal people ===
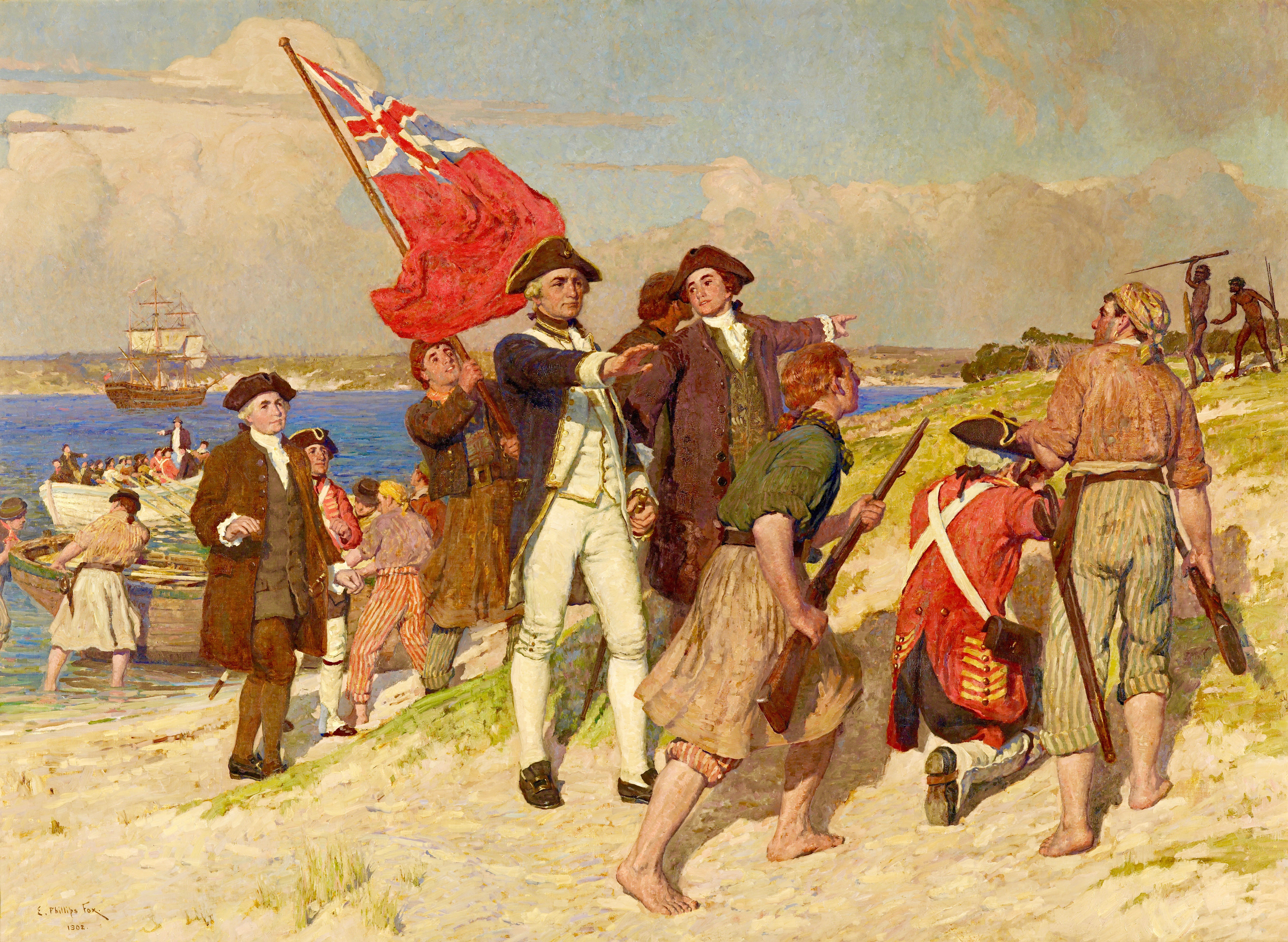
Cook's landing at Botany Bay (Kamay), 1770

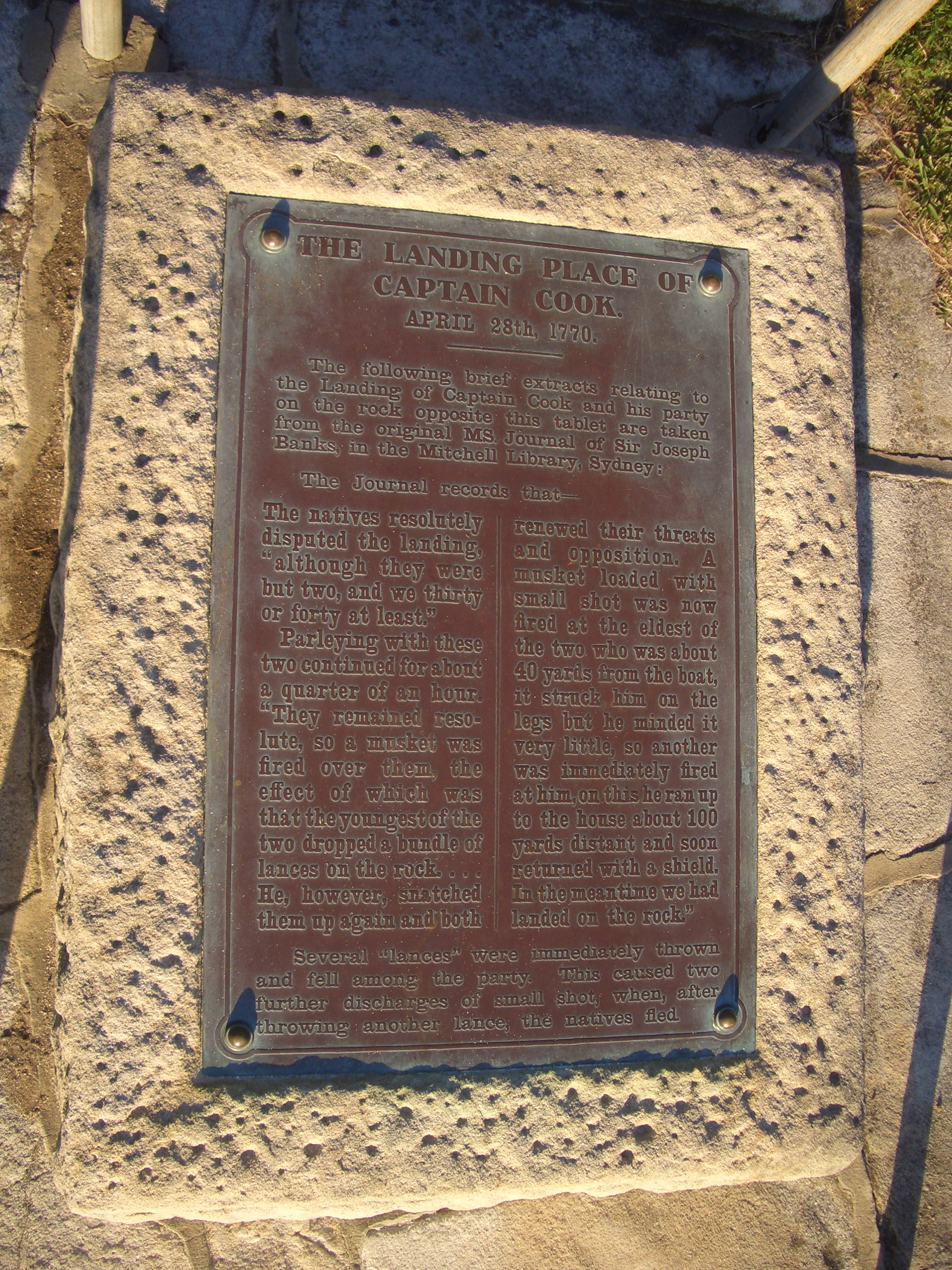
Captain Cook landing place plaque

Endeavour continued northwards along the coastline, keeping the land in sight with Cook charting and naming landmarks as he went. A little over a week later, they came across an extensive but shallow inlet, and upon entering it moored off a low headland fronted by sand dunes.

On 29 April, Cook and crew made their first landfall on the continent at a beach now known as Silver Beach on Botany Bay (Kamay). Two Gweagal men of the Dharawal / Eora nation came down to the boat to fend off what they thought to be spirits of the dead. They shouted 'warra warra wai' meaning 'you are all dead' and gestured with their spears. Cook's party attempted to communicate their desire for water and threw gifts of beads and nails ashore. The two Aboriginal men continued to oppose the landing and Cook fired a warning shot. One of the Gweagal men responded by throwing a rock, and Cook fired on them with small shot, wounding one of them in the leg. The crew then landed, and the Gweagal men threw two spears before Cook fired another round of small shot and they retreated. The landing party found several children in nearby huts, and left some beads and other gifts with them. The landing party collected 40 to 50 spears and other artefacts.

Cook and his crew stayed at Botany Bay for a week, collecting water, timber, fodder and botanical specimens and exploring the surrounding area. The Indigenous inhabitants observed the Europeans closely but generally retreated whenever they approached. Cook's party made several attempts to establish relations with the Indigenous people, but they showed no interest in the food and gifts the Europeans offered, and occasionally threw spears as an apparent warning. (Note: This date does not need adjustment because it occurred during the afternoon (p.m.) on 29 April in the ship's log, but was the afternoon of the civil date of 28 April, 14 hours west of port, which is now a civil date 10 hours east of port, 24 hours later, hence a modern civil date of 29 April.)

At first Cook named the inlet "Sting-Ray Harbour" after the many stingrays found there. This was later changed to "Botanist Bay" and finally Botany Bay after the unique specimens retrieved by the botanists Joseph Banks and Daniel Solander. This first landing site was later to be promoted (particularly by Joseph Banks) as a suitable candidate for situating a settlement and British colonial outpost.

=== Port Jackson ===
On 6 May 1770, Endeavour left Botany Bay and sailed north past an inlet "wherein there appeared to be safe anchorage". Cook named it Port Jackson, today generally known as Sydney Harbour. Margaret Cameron-Ash argues that Cook had observed the harbour earlier during an overland excursion from Botany Bay and saw that it contained several islands. Geoffrey Blainey, however, states that more evidence is required to support this theory.

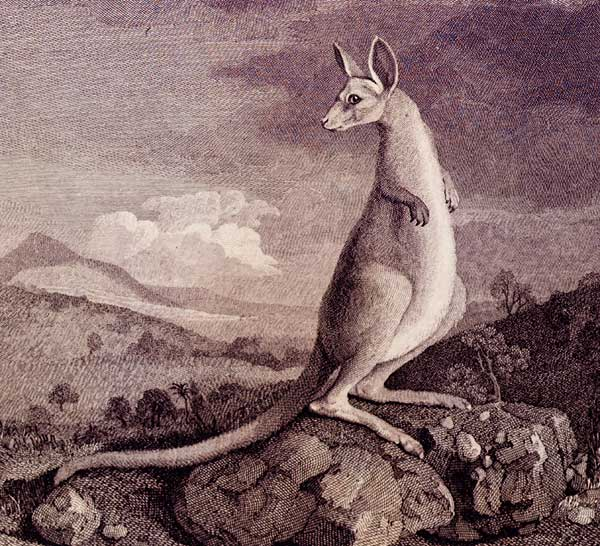
This kangaroo was seen at Endeavour River on 23 June 1770, painted by Sydney Parkinson

=== Seventeen Seventy ===
Cook continued northwards, charting along the coastline. He stopped at Bustard Bay (now known as Seventeen Seventy) at 8 o'clock on 23 May 1770 in five fathoms water on a sandy bottom at the south point of the Bay. Cook recounted that his clerk, Orton, had been molested while dead drunk that night, the perpetrators cutting off not only his clothes but also parts of his ears. Cook suspended and sent below the suspect Magra. On 24 May Cook and Banks and others went ashore. He sounded the channel (now known as Round Hill Creek) and found a freshwater stream, noting there was room for a few ships to safely anchor. He noted a great deal of smoke on the hills and inspected one of the closest group of 10 fires around which were scattered cockle shells and other evidence of Aboriginal occupation.

=== Endeavour River ===
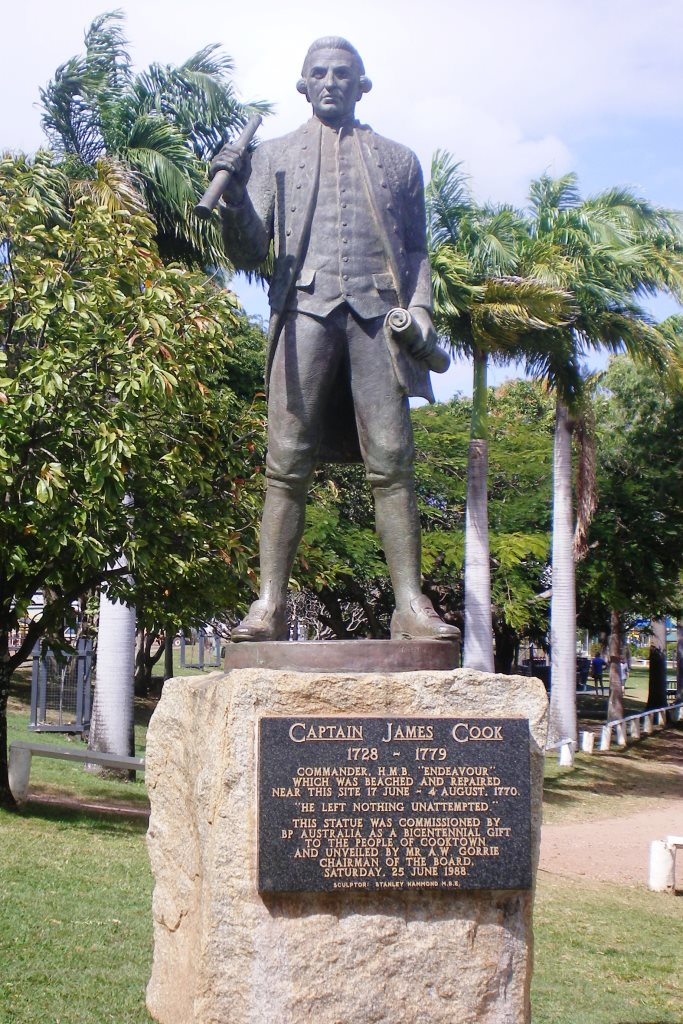
Captain James Cook Commander, H.M.B. "Endeavour" which was beached and repaired near this site 17 June – 4 August 1770

On 11 June 1770, Endeavour ran aground on a shoal of the Great Barrier Reef. The ship struck at high tide and the immediate problem was to get her off. All surplus weight, including the six guns, was jettisoned; the three operational pumps were continuously manned in 15 minute shifts. After 23 hours, having failed to get free on the previous high tide, she was hauled off with the anchors that had been set out. A sail was fothered over the damaged part of the hull, reducing the leaks to something that could be controlled by just one pump. It was not until 16 June that Cook was able to get Endeavour into a river mouth that was suitable for careening the ship to make repairs.

The ship was seriously damaged and his voyage was delayed almost seven weeks while repairs were carried out on the beach (near the docks of modern Cooktown, at the mouth of the Endeavour River). While there, Joseph Banks and Daniel Solander worked on their collections of Australian flora and fauna. The crew's encounters with the local Guugu Yimidhirr people were mainly peaceable, although following a dispute over green turtles Cook ordered shots to be fired and one local was lightly wounded. The word "kangaroo" entered the English language, from the Guugu Yimidhirr word for a kind of grey kangaroo, gangurru (pronounced [ɡ̊aŋuru]).

On 6 July, Satterly, the ship's carpenter, reported that he had done all he could to repair the ship. This was with the knowledge that the after part of the hull could not be properly inspected – there was no way of heaving the ship over to make that part accessible. What neither Cook nor Satterly knew at that stage was the extent of the undiscovered damage. When got into the Dutch dockyard facilities in Batavia, they could see that a 6 feet (1.8 m) length, two and a half planks wide had been cut by the coral, leaving only one-eighth inch (3.2 mm) of timber to keep the ship watertight. Those who saw Endeavour in the careening dock in Batavia were surprised that she had remained afloat.

=== Possession Island ===
With repair work finished, Cook had to wait until 3 August for the right combination of wind and tide to head out to sea. (Note: Getting to sea was a problem, as the prevailing wind was onshore. The river had a shallow bar at the entrance, which Endeavour could only get over at high tide. Cook was obliged to kedge the ship out. This process involves a ship's boat carrying an anchor and its cable to the point you want to reach, dropping the anchor and then taking the cable back to the ship (paying it out on the way). The capstan was then used to heave the ship towards the anchor. This was a standard task of seamanship at the time; ships' boats were designed to carry the anchors from their parent vessels.) At about midday on 22 August 1770, Cook reached the northernmost tip of the coast. Without leaving the ship, he named it York Cape (now Cape York). Searching for a high vantage point, Cook saw a steep hill on a nearby island from the top of which he hoped to see "a passage into the Indian Seas". Cook named the island Possession Island, where he claimed the entire eastern coastline that he had just explored as British territory.

Turning west, he nursed the battered ship through the dangerously shallow waters of Torres Strait, earlier navigated by Luis Váez de Torres in 1606. In negotiating the Torres Strait past Cape York, Cook confirmed that New Holland and New Guinea were not part of the same land mass. He had already established that New Holland was not joined to the islands later called the New Hebrides, as a chart by Didier Robert de Vaugondy showed.

=== Scurvy prevention ===
At that point in the voyage Cook had lost not a single man to scurvy, a remarkable and practically unheard-of achievement in 18th-century long-distance seafaring. Adhering to Royal Navy policy introduced in 1747, Cook persuaded his men to eat foods such as citrus fruits and sauerkraut. At that time it was known that poor diet caused scurvy but not specifically that a vitamin C deficiency was the culprit.

Sailors of the day were notoriously against innovation, and at first the men would not eat the sauerkraut. Cook used a "method I never once knew to fail with seamen". He ordered it served to himself and the officers, and left an option for crew who wanted some. Within a week of seeing their superiors set a value on it the demand was so great a ration had to be instituted. In other cases, however, Cook resorted to traditional naval discipline. "Punished Henry Stephens, Seaman, and Thomas Dunster, Marine, with twelve lashes each for refusing to take their allowance of fresh beef."

Cook's general approach was essentially empirical, encouraging as broad a diet as circumstances permitted, and collecting such greens as could be had when making landfall. All onboard ate the same food, with Cook specifically dividing equally anything that could be divided (and indeed recommending that practice to any commander – journal 4 August 1770).

Two cases of scurvy did occur on board, astronomer Charles Green and a Tahiti navigator Tupaia were treated, but Cook was able to proudly record that upon reaching Batavia he had "not one man upon the sick list" (journal 15 October 1770), unlike so many voyages that reached that port with much of the crew suffering illness.

== Homeward voyage ==
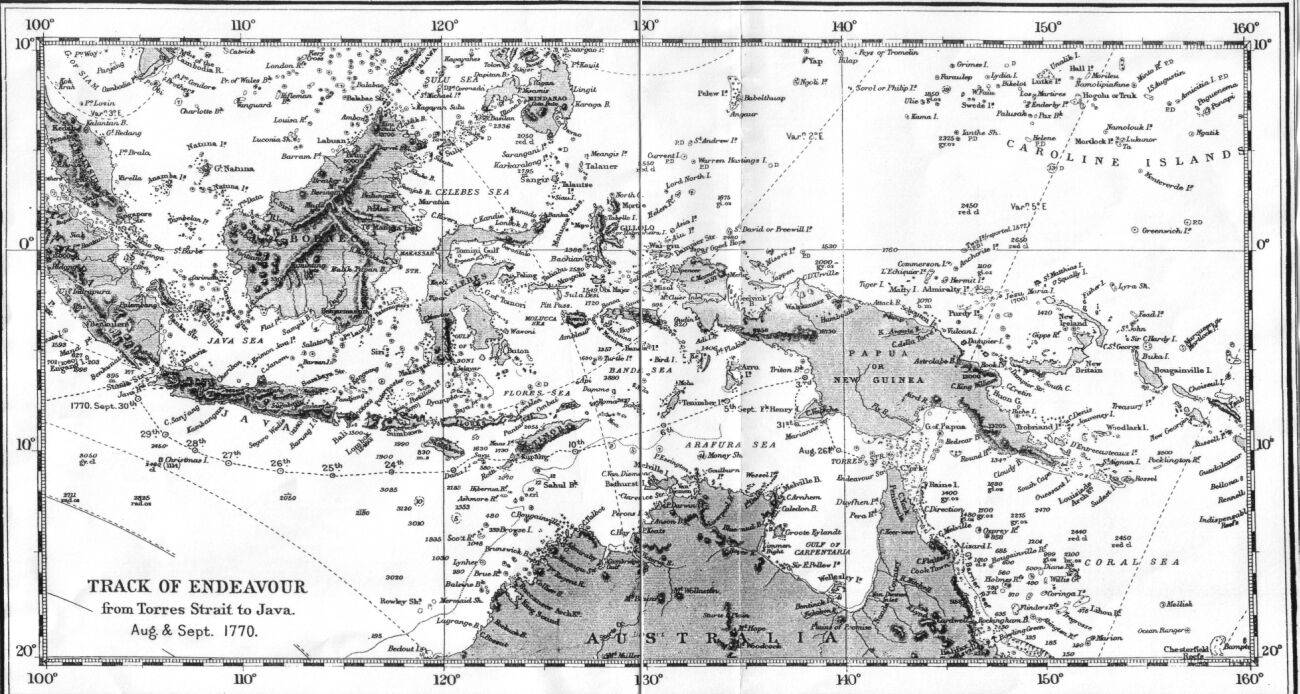
Route of Endeavour from the Torres Strait to Java, August and September 1770

Endeavour then visited the island of Savu, staying for three days before continuing on to Batavia, the capital of the Dutch East Indies, to put in for repairs. Batavia was known for its outbreaks of malaria, and before they returned home in 1771 many in Cook's company succumbed to the disease and, in particular, dysentery, including the Tahitian Tupaia, Banks' Finnish secretary and fellow scientist Herman Spöring, astronomer Charles Green, and the illustrator Sydney Parkinson. Cook named Spöring Island off the coast of New Zealand to honour Herman Spöring and his work on the voyage. Losses among the crew included John Satterly, the ship's carpenter who had carried out repairs after the grounding on the barrier reef, Robert Molyneux (ship's master), Zachary Hicks (lieutenant), Jonathan Monkhouse (midshipman) and John Ravenhill (sail maker). In all, seven of the expedition died in Batavia and a further 23 on the passage from there to England. Cook likened Endeavour to a "hospital ship", with so many ill that those who were healthy were barely able to work the ship and nurse the sick.

Cook then rounded the Cape of Good Hope and stopped at Saint Helena. On 10 July 1771 Nicholas Young, the boy who had first seen New Zealand, sighted England (specifically the Lizard) again for the first time, and Endeavour sailed up the English Channel, passing Beachy Head at 6 a.m. on 12 July; that afternoon Endeavour anchored in the Downs, and Cook went ashore at Deal, Kent. His return was unexpected, as newspapers and journals had long since reported fears that Endeavour had been lost at sea or destroyed in combat against the French.

== Publication of journals ==
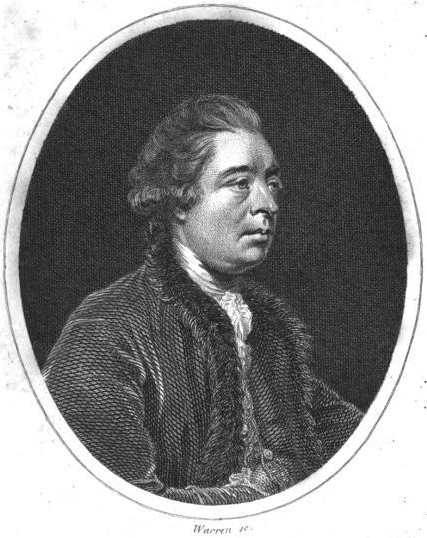
John Hawkesworth

Cook's journals, along with those of Banks, were handed over to the Admiralty to be published upon his return. John Montagu, 4th Earl of Sandwich contracted, for £6,000, John Hawkesworth a literary critic, essayist, and editor of The Gentleman's Magazine to publish a comprehensive account of exploration in the Pacific: not just Cook's ventures but also those of Wallis, Byron and Carteret. Hawkesworth edited the journals of Byron, Wallis and Carteret into separate accounts as volume I and then blended Cook's and Joseph Banks' journals with some of his own sentiments and produced a single first-person narrative that appeared to be the words of Cook, as volume II. The book appeared in 1773 as three volumes with the title:

AN ACCOUNT OF THE VOYAGES undertaken by Order of His Present Majesty for making Discoveries in the Southern Hemisphere, and successively performed by Commodore Byron, Captain Wallis, Captain Carteret and Captain Cook, in the Dolphin, the Swallow and the Endeavour: Drawn up from the Journals which were kept by the several Commanders, and from the Papers of Joseph Banks, Esq.; by John Hawkesworth, LL.D. In three volumes. Illustrated with Cuts, and a great Variety of Charts and Maps relative to Countries now first discovered, or hitherto but imperfectly known.

— Printed for W. Strahan & T. Cadell in the Strand. London: MDCCLXXIII

The book went on sale on 9 June 1773 but widespread criticism in the press made the publication a personal disaster for Hawkesworth. Reviewers complained that the reader had no way to tell which part of the account was Cook, which part Banks and which part Hawkesworth and others were offended by the books' descriptions of the voyagers' sexual encounters with the Tahitians. Cook was at sea again before the book was published and was later much disturbed by some of the sentiments that Hawkesworth had ascribed to him. He determined to edit his own journals in future.

The papers of Sydney Parkinson, the botanical draughtsman of Joseph Banks who had died on the homeward voyage, were published by his brother Stanfield under the title A Journal of a Voyage to the South Seas. A legal injunction delayed the publication until two days after Hawkesworth's Account had appeared.

== Re-enactment ==
In 1959, the Cooktown Re-enactment Association first performed a re-enactment of Cook's 1770 landing at the site of modern Cooktown, Australia, and have continued the tradition each year, with the support and participation of many of the local Guugu Yimithirr people. They celebrate the first act of reconciliation between Indigenous Australians and non-Indigenous people, based on a particular incident. Cook and his crew had developed a friendly relationship with the local people, recording more than 130 words of their language. However, after the crew refused to share 12 green turtles which they had caught, thus violating local customs, the locals became angry. A Guugu Yimithirr elder stepped in, presenting Cook with a broken-tipped spear as a peace offering, thus preventing an escalation which could have ended in bloodshed.

In 1970, Hans Hass shot the documentary television film Unsere Reise mit James Cook (Our Journey with James Cook), in which he retraced Cook's journey through the barrier reef using Cook's journal. Hass dived at various locations.

In 2001, the BBC set about making a documentary series The Ship: Retracing Cook's Endeavour Voyage which involved a film crew, volunteers and historians retracing part of the voyage made by Cook – from Cairns to Jakarta. One of the historians, Alexander Cook, documented the journey in his 2004 article "Sailing on The Ship: Re-enactment and the Quest for Popular History".

== See also ==
- List of Australian places named by James Cook
- Endeavour journal of James Cook
