= Shadow blister effect =

Distortion of shadows caused by moving objects

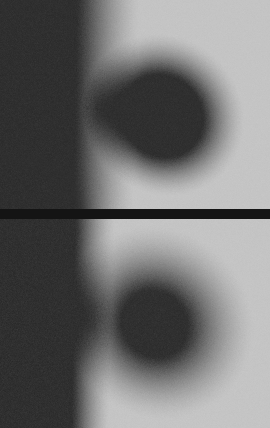
Two examples of the shadow blister effect

The shadow blister effect is a visual phenomenon in which a shadow bulges (or blisters) as it approaches another.

Circle in front, wall in front, equidistant
The shadow distorts for the object positioned furthest from the light source. If both objects are the same distance from the light source, the effect does not take place.

The effect takes place when two objects are at varying distances between a non-point light source and a background upon which their shadows are cast. As the objects move transversely such that their shadows approach each other, the one nearest the light source begins blocking light from reaching the inside of the other object's penumbra, thereby expanding its umbra. This expansion of the further object's umbra continues until the umbras of both objects meet.

This effect can be demonstrated and understood using ray theory.

Video demonstrating the cause of the shadow blister effect

The shadow blister effect is commonly misconceived to be an illusion caused by the combining of the two object's penumbras, aided by factors such as diffraction, nonlinear response, and the eye's inability to differentiate between varying contrasts.

== See also ==
- Black drop effect
