= USS Ability (AFDL-7) =

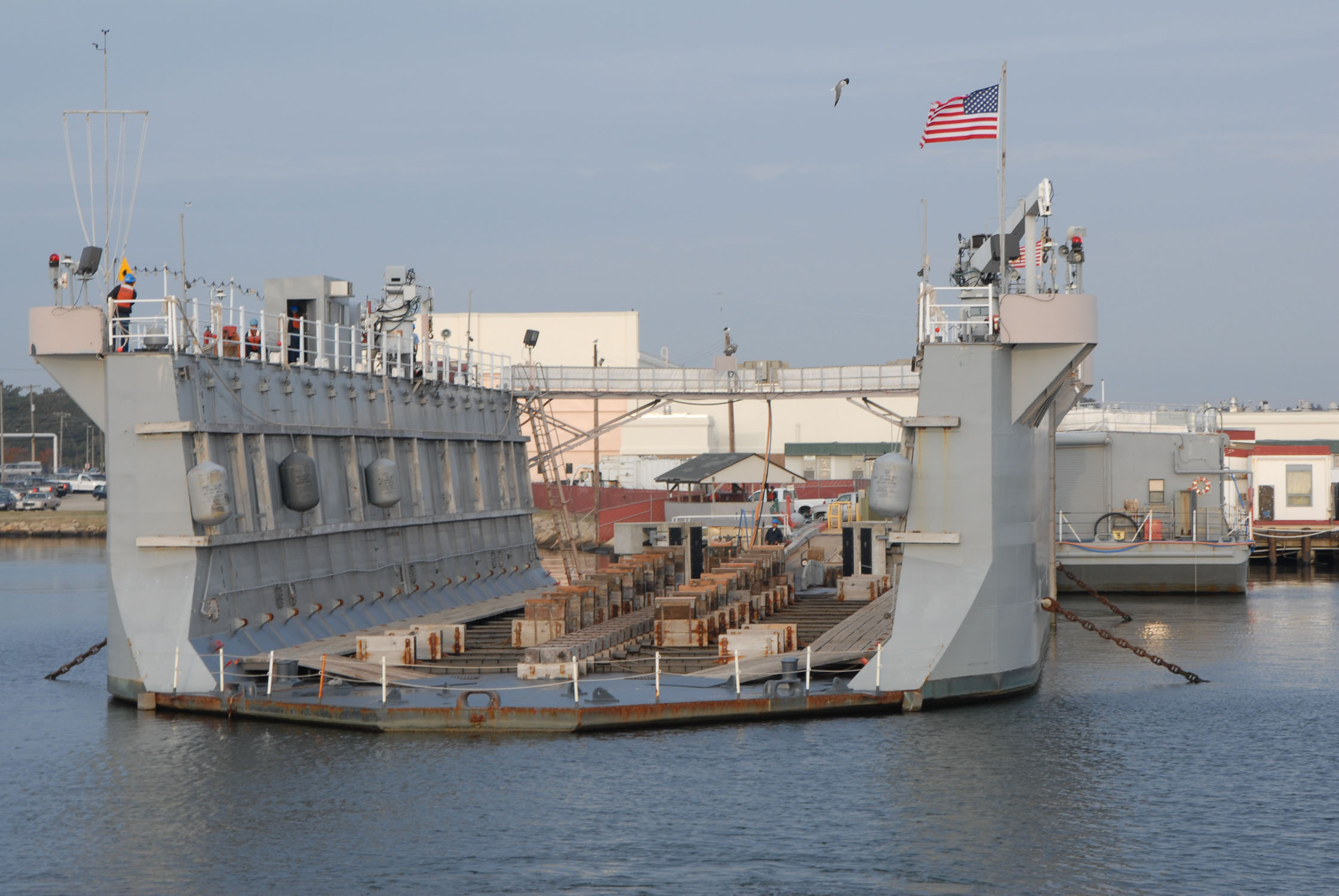
- Sister ship of USS Ability, the USS Dynamic AFDL-6

History

United States
- Name: AFD-7 (1943–1946); AFDL-7 (1946–1979); Ability (1979–1981)
- Namesake: Ability
- Builder: Chicago Bridge & Iron Company, Eureka, California
- Laid down: 1943
- Launched: April 1944
- Commissioned: 1944
- Decommissioned: 1 January 1947
- Fate: Laid up in the Pacific Reserve Fleet, Pearl Harbor Group; Transferred on loan to the US Army, June 1970; Returned to US Naval custody, October 1971; Laid up in the Pacific Reserve Fleet, Guam
- In service: 1 January 1973
- Out of service: 1981
- Renamed: Ability, 7 June 1979
- Stricken: 15 February 1981
- Identification: Hull symbol: AFDL-7
- Fate: Sold for scrapping, 1 July 1982

General characteristics
- Class & type: AFDL-1-class small auxiliary floating dry dock
- Displacement: 1,200 long tons (1,200 t)
- Length: 288 ft (88 m)
- Beam: 64 ft (20 m); 45 ft (14 m) (clear width inside dry dock)
- Draft: 3 ft 3 in (0.99 m) empty; 31 ft 4 in (9.55 m) flooded
- Speed: non-self-propelled
- Capacity: 1,900 long tons (1,900 t)
- Complement: 40

The third USS Ability (AFD-7/AFDL-7) was a small auxiliary floating drydock in the service of the United States Navy.

== Construction ==
The construction of AFD-7, a one-section, steel, floating dry dock built at Eureka, California, by the Chicago Bridge & Iron Co., was begun sometime early in 1943 and was completed in April 1944.

== Service history ==
The small, non-self-propelled auxiliary floating dry dock was then towed to the east coast for duty at the US Coast Guard base at Curtis Bay, Maryland, where she began a long career of docking small naval combatants (up to the size of destroyer escorts) for hull repairs.

At the end of World War II, the vessel returned to the Pacific and proceeded via Pearl Harbor to Guam. While serving there, she was redesignated AFDL-7 in August 1946. Following brief operations at the naval operating base at Guam, AFDL-7 was taken out of service on 1 January 1947, and laid up with the Pacific Reserve Fleet. Some time in 1948, she was towed back to Hawaii and laid up at Pearl Harbor. New Year's Day 1950, found her at the Long Beach Naval Shipyard for repairs, which lasted into the following year. Two years later, she was back at Pearl Harbor still inactive. She was inactive, in reserve, there until June 1970, when she was transferred, on loan, to the United States Army for service in South Vietnam. In October 1971, the small dry dock was returned to the United States Navy and laid up at Guam. On 1 January 1973, she was reactivated and served at various advanced Pacific bases. She remained in this status through 1980.

During this period of service, AFDL-7 was named Ability on 7 June 1979. While at Guam, she was taken out of service early in 1981. Her name was struck from the Navy list on 15 February 1981. She was sold for scrap on 1 July 1982.

== See also ==
- USS Endeavor (AFDL-1)

== Bibliography ==
Online resources

- Mooney, James L. (8 February 2016). "Ability III (AFDL-7)". Dictionary of American Naval Fighting Ships. Naval History and Heritage Command. This article incorporates text from this source, which is in the public domain.
- "Ability (AFDL-7)". NavSource. 7 December 2007.
