= Endeavour journal of James Cook =

Endeavour journal of James Cook is a diary and ship's logbook written by Lieutenant James Cook, captain of HMS Endeavour, on his first voyage of exploration in the Pacific Ocean from 1768 to 1771. The handwritten journal is in the collection of the National Library of Australia located in Canberra.

The journal includes observations of the 1769 transit of Venus from Tahiti, the first European charting of the east coast of Australia and the first circumnavigation of New Zealand. The original document, in Cook's handwriting, foreshadows British colonization of Australia, including one of the earliest written records of the indigenous peoples of Polynesia, New Zealand and eastern Australia.

== Description ==
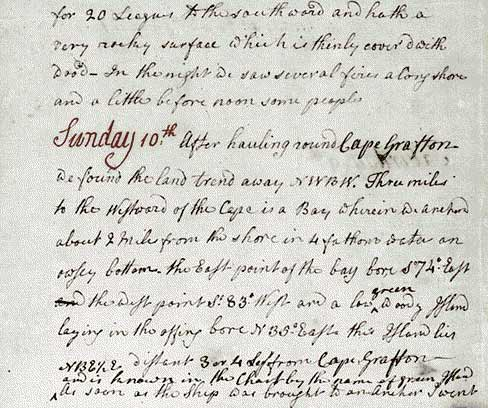
James Cook Endeavour Journal 489b

The journal, handwritten by James Cook, consists of one volume of 753 pages bound in oak and pigskin. The journal documents one of the first English voyages to the Pacific Ocean, departing from Plymouth on 26 August 1768. The voyage circumnavigated the globe with three main objectives, to observe and record the transit of Venus from Tahiti on 3 June 1769; to record natural history; and a secret mission to search for the Great South Land. Cook's last entry in the journal on 12 July 1771 records HMS Endeavour anchored in the Downs, an anchorage for ships off the east coast of Kent, near the port of Deal.

== History of the logbook and journal ==
The Endeavour journal is in the National Library of Australia collection. A digitized version of the journal is available online.

=== Acquisition ===
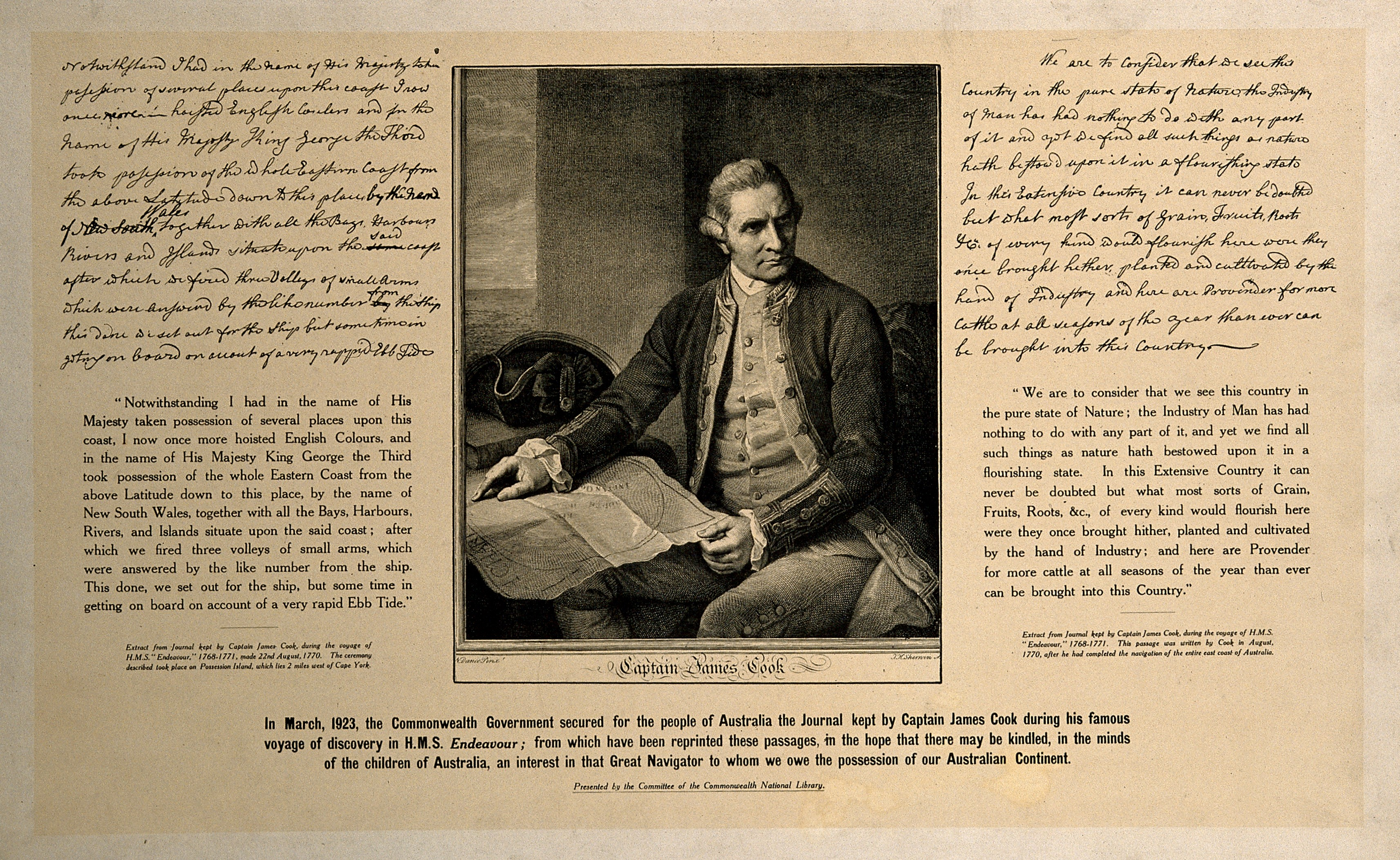
James Cook. Reproduction of line engraving. Wellcome V0006478

From 1868 to 1923 the Endeavour journal was in the possession of the Bolckow family of Marton-in Cleveland, Yorkshire. The journal was purchased by the Australian Government at a Sotheby's sale in London in 1923.

=== Memory of the World ===
The journal was added to the UNESCO Memory of the World International Register and to the Australian Memory of the World Register in 2001. The Endeavour Journal is a key document foreshadowing British colonisation of Australia. It has been cited in works on Pacific exploration and first contacts between Europeans and the indigenous peoples of Australia, New Zealand and the Pacific.

== See also ==
- An Account of the Voyages
- First voyage of James Cook
