= Australian Memory of the World Register =

The Australian Memory of the World Register is a national register of Australia's documentary heritage maintained by UNESCO as part of the Memory of the World Programme. As of 2024, it includes 78 different collections and archives.

Some of the entries on the Australian register are also included in the Memory of the World International Register which recognises documentary heritage of global importance.

Documentary heritage^{[A]}	Custodian(s), Location(s)	Year inscribed	Reference
The Endeavour journal of James Cook	National Library of Australia, Canberra 35°17′48″S 149°07′47″E	2001	
The Mabo Case Manuscripts	National Library of Australia, Canberra 35°17′48″S 149°07′47″E	2001	
The Story of the Kelly Gang (1906)	National Film and Sound Archive, Canberra 35°17′00″S 149°07′17″E	2004	
The Convict Records of Australia	State Records Authority of New South Wales 33°46′22″S 150°44′32″E; Archives Office of Tasmania 42°52′55″S 147°19′30″E; State Records Office of Western Australia: Alexander Library Building, Perth Cultural Centre 31°56′57″S 115°51′37″E	2006	
Mountford-Sheard Collection	State Library of South Australia, Adelaide 34°55′15″S 138°36′08″E	2008	
Margaret Lawrie Collection of Torres Strait Islands, 1964–1998	State Library of Queensland, Brisbane 27°28′16″S 153°01′05″E	2008	
Manifesto of the Queensland Labour Party, 1892	State Library of Queensland, Brisbane 27°28′16″S 153°01′05″E	2008	
The Convict Records of Queensland 1825–1842	State Library of Queensland, Brisbane 27°28′16″S 153°01′05″E Queensland State Archives, Brisbane 27°36′38″S 153°04′26″E	2009	
James Tyson Papers, 1834–1965	State Library of Queensland, Brisbane 27°28′16″S 153°01′05″E Queensland State Archives, Brisbane 27°36′38″S 153°04′26″E National Library of Australia, Canberra 35°17′48″S 149°07′47″E Deniliquin and District Historical Society 35°31′22″S 144°57′47″E	2017	
Giant Glass Plate Negatives of Sydney Harbour	State Library of New South Wales, Sydney 33°51′58″S 151°12′48″E	2017	
Anzac Day Commemoration Committee, 1916–1922	State Library of Queensland, Brisbane 27°28′16″S 153°01′05″E	2019	
Dr Barbara Piscitelli AM Children's Art Archive 1986–2016; 2020	State Library of Queensland, Brisbane 27°28′16″S 153°01′05″E	2023	
The Johnstone Gallery Archive, 1948–1992	State Library of Queensland, Brisbane 27°28′16″S 153°01′05″E	2021	

== Notes ==
Names and spellings provided are based on the official list released by the Memory of the World Programme.
