= Matavai Bay =

Bay on the north coast of Tahiti, French Polynesia

Coordinates: 17°30′S 149°30′W

Matavai Bay is a bay on the north coast of Tahiti, the largest island in the Windward group of French Polynesia. It is in the commune of Mahina, approximately 8 km east of the capital Pape'ete.

== Early European voyages ==
The bay was visited by European voyages of discovery in the second half of the 18th century for wood, water and supplies. As late as 1802, Governor King of New South Wales considered Tahiti "the only island that needs little or no precaution for the safety of those who visit it".

=== Samuel Wallis ===
The first European known to have visited Tahiti was Captain Samuel Wallis, in Dolphin, who landed on 17 June 1767 in Matavai Bay. The first contacts with the native Tahitians were difficult, since on the 24 and the 26 June 1767, canoes tried to take the ship and beach it. In retaliation, the English sailors opened fire on the canoes and on the crowds on the hills. In reaction to this powerful counter-attack, the inhabitants of the bay laid down offerings for the English, showing their wish for peace or to submit. Following this episode, Samuel Wallis was able to establish cordial relations with the female chieftain Oberea (Purea) and remained on the island until 27 July 1767.

Wallis named the bay Port Royal.

=== Bougainville ===
On 2 April 1768 Louis Antoine de Bougainville, completing the first French circumnavigation in Boudeuse and Étoile, landed in Matavai Bay. He stayed about ten days on the island, which he called “Nouvelle-Cythère“, or "New Cythera", because of the warm welcome he had received and the sweetness of the Tahitian customs.

=== James Cook ===
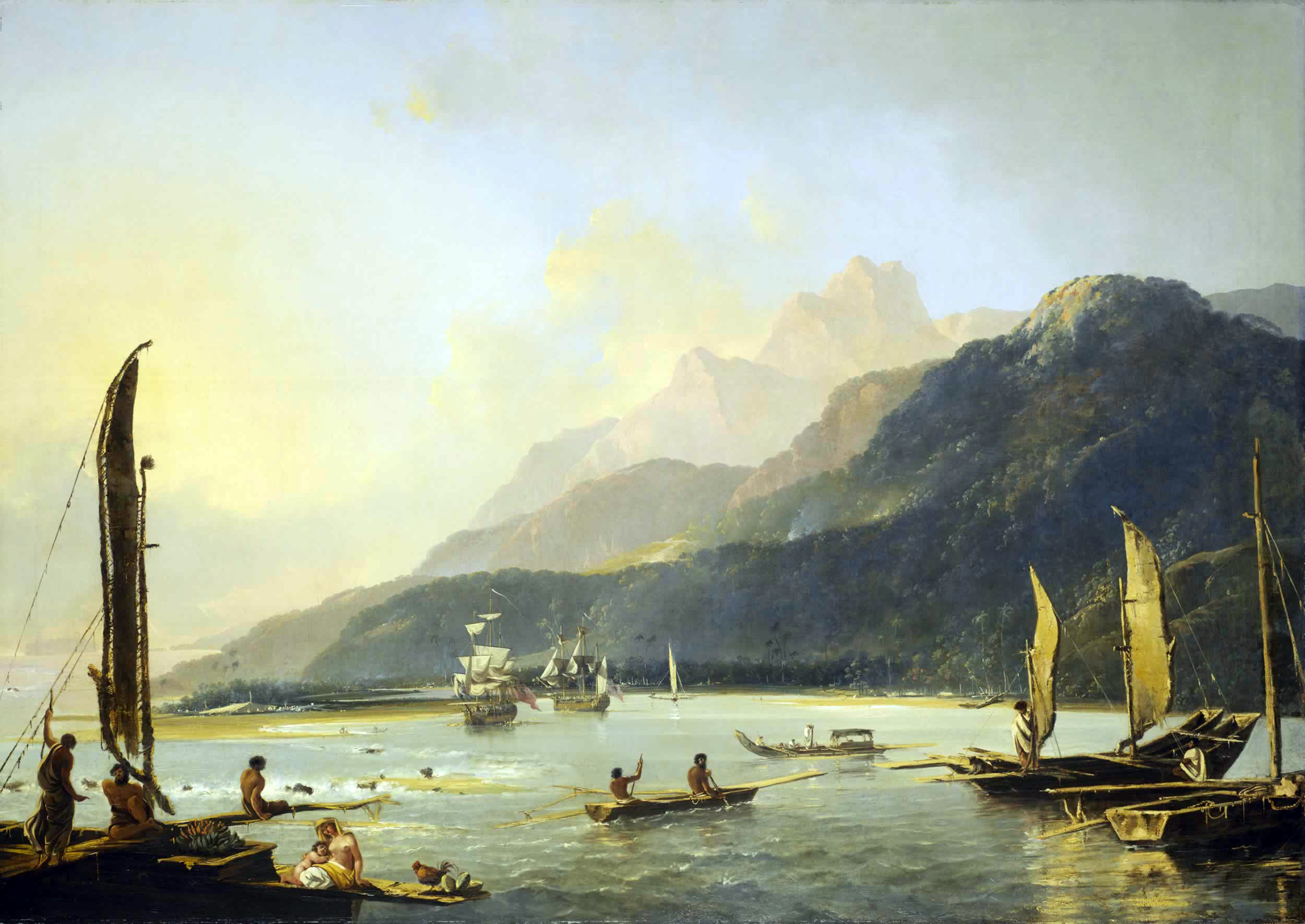
Resolution and Adventure in Matavai Bay by William Hodges. Point Venus is visible at left. National Maritime Museum, Greenwich.

A primary objective of James Cook's first voyage, in Endeavour, was to observe the 1769 Transit of Venus from the South Pacific. Tahiti was chosen for the observations based on Wallis's recent discoveries. Endeavour's third lieutenant was John Gore, who had served as master's mate on Dolphin. Cook anchored in the bay on 13 April 1769. A sandy spit on the northeast end of Matavai Bay – named Point Venus by Cook – was chosen for the observatory. The location of the observatory would be known as "Fort Venus." Cook departed on 13 July 1769.

Cook also visited Matavai Bay on 26 August-1 September 1773 and 22 April-14 May 1774 during his second voyage, and 23 August-29 September 1777 during his third voyage. Cook was fond of Tahiti and Matavai Bay. Historian Hampton Sides described Matavai Bay as "the spot on Tahiti where Cook felt most welcome, and the epicenter of Tahitian life."

=== Lady Penrhyn ===
Lady Penrhyn was a convict transport in the First Fleet. Following her arrival in New South Wales, she was under contract to go to the "North West Coast of America to Trade for furrs & after that to proceed to China & barter the Furrs &ca for Teas or other such Goods..." She departed Sydney Cove on 5 May 1788 and sailed north with the intention of purchasing furs in Kamchatka for resale in China.

The poor condition of the ship and sickness among her crew compelled Lady Penrhyn to stop in Matavai Bay in July 1788, where the crew recovered and the ship was repaired. John Watts, who was acting as supercargo, had visited previously as a midshipman in Resolution on James Cook's third voyage. The voyage is documented in the published journals of Watts and surgeon Arthur Bowes Smyth.

=== Bligh's first breadfruit voyage ===
In 1787, William Bligh took command of Bounty on a mission to convey breadfruit from the South Pacific to the Caribbean. Bligh had served as sailing master of Resolution during Cook's third voyage. Bounty reached Tahiti on 26 October 1788, after ten months at sea. Bligh and his crew spent five months in Tahiti. They established a nursery at Point Venus, collecting and preparing 1015 breadfruit plants to be transported. Bligh allowed the crew to live ashore and care for the potted breadfruit plants, and they became socialized to the customs and culture of the Tahitians. Bounty departed with her breadfruit cargo on 4 April 1789. Part of the crew mutinied on 28 April 1789.

=== HMS Pandora ===
Pandora, under Captain Edward Edwards, was sent from England to search for the Bounty and the mutineers. Pandora reached Tahiti on 23 March 1791 and recovered 14 crew members from Bounty. On 8 May 1791 Pandora left Tahiti and subsequently spent three months in the South-West Pacific in search of the Bounty and the remaining mutineers, without finding any traces of her or them. Pandora was wrecked in Torres Strait on the return voyage.

=== Vancouver ===
The Vancouver Expedition, in Discovery and Chatham, visited Matavai Bay in from 29 December 1791 to 24 January 24, 1792. George Vancouver had previously visited Matavai Bay on Cook's second and third expeditions.

=== Bligh's second breadfruit voyage ===
From 1791 to 1793 Bligh, in Providence, in company with Assistant under Nathaniel Portlock, undertook a second attempt to convey breadfruit to the West Indies. He arrived at Matavai Bay on 9 April 1792 and stayed for three months collecting the breadfruit plants.

=== London Missionary Society ===
Duff landed missionaries from the London Missionary Society at Matavai Bay on 5 March 1797 to establish a mission at Point Venus.

== See also ==
- First voyage of James Cook
- 1769 Transit of Venus observed from Tahiti
- Tautira Bay, which Cook visited on his second and third voyages
