= Point Venus =

Peninsula in Mahina, Tahiti

Coordinates: 17°29′44″S 149°29′40″W

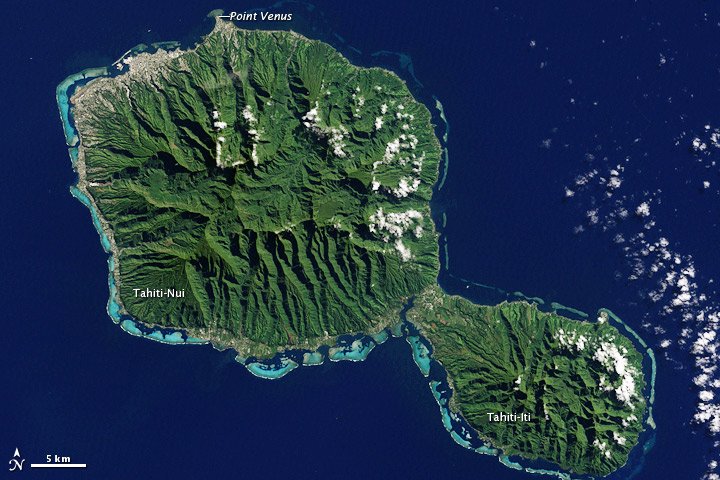
Point Venus is marked in this annotated Landsat image

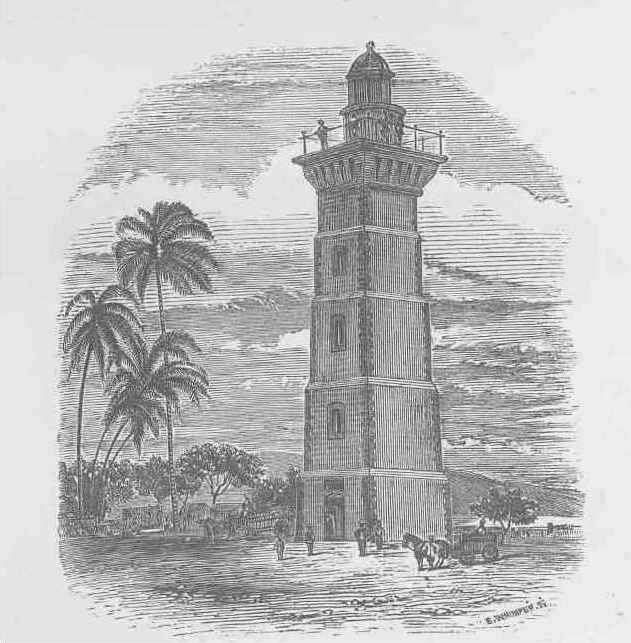
Point Venus Lighthouse, Tahiti (LMS, 1869, p.)

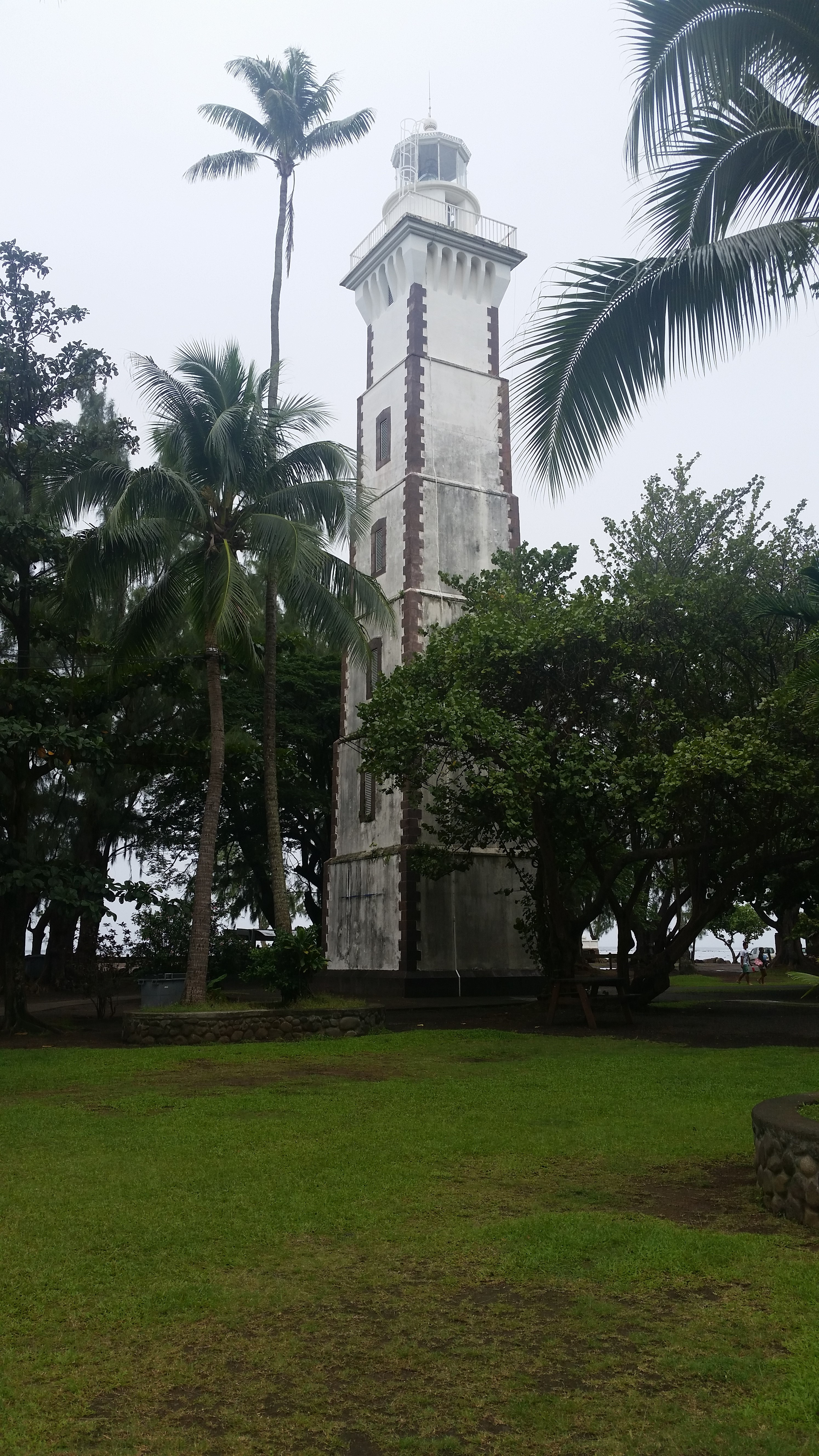
The lighthouse in 2017

Point Venus is a peninsula on the north coast of Tahiti, the largest island in the Windward group of French Polynesia. It is in the commune of Mahina, approximately 8 km east of the capital, Pape'ete. It lies at the northeast end of Matavai Bay.

== History ==
A primary objective of James Cook's first voyage, in Endeavour, was to observe the 1769 Transit of Venus from the South Pacific. Tahiti, recently visited by Samuel Wallis in Dolphin, was chosen for the observations. Cook anchored in Matavai Bay on 12 April 1769 and established an observatory, and a fortified camp called "Fort Venus", at Te Auroa, which they named "Point Venus".
