= Black drop effect =

Visual distortion of Venus when it transits the sun

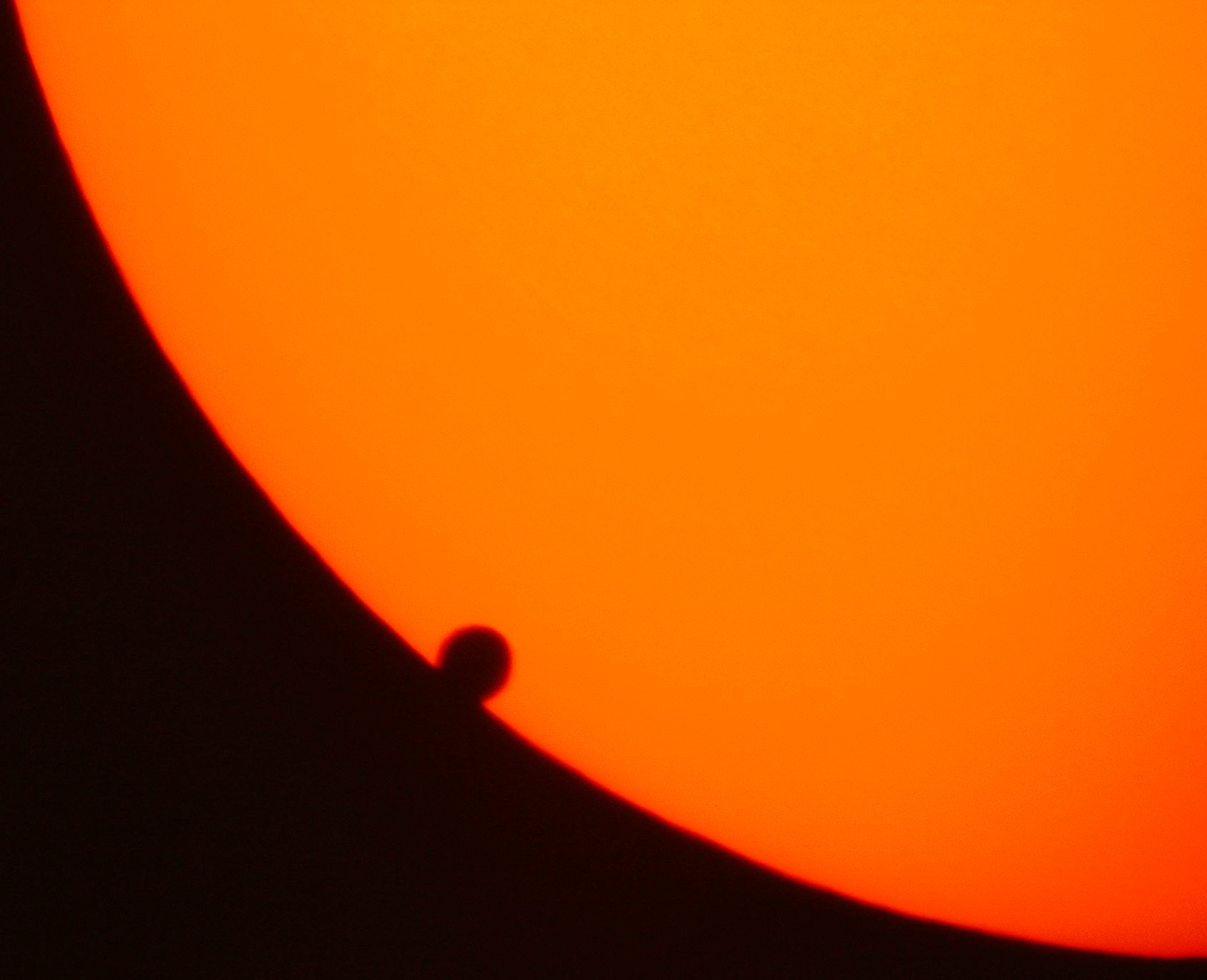
Venus transits the face of the Sun on 8 June 2004. Here, the black drop effect is visible.

The black drop effect is an optical phenomenon visible during a transit of Venus and, to a lesser extent, a transit of Mercury.

== Description ==
Just after second contact, and again just before third contact during the transit, a small black "teardrop" appears to connect Venus's disc to the limb of the Sun, making it impossible to time the exact moment of second or third contact accurately. This led to the failure of the attempts during the 18th-century transits of Venus to establish a truly precise value for the astronomical unit.

The black drop effect was long thought to be due to Venus's thick atmosphere, and indeed it was held to be the first real evidence that Venus had an atmosphere. However, it is now thought by many to be an optical effect caused by the combination of the extreme darkening of the Sun's disk near its apparent edge and the intrinsic imperfection of the viewing apparatus.

Observing Mercury simultaneously during its transit in May 1832 with different instruments, the German astronomers Friedrich Wilhelm Bessel and Friedrich Wilhelm Argelander noticed a black drop effect (though the term had not been coined yet) with that instrument of less resolution. With precise measurements, a black drop effect was observed from outside the Earth's atmosphere during the 1999 and 2003 transits of Mercury, although Mercury has no significant atmosphere.

In the 8 June 2004 transit of Venus, many observers reported that they did not see the black drop effect, or at least that it was much less pronounced than had been reported in earlier centuries' transits. Larger telescopes, better optics, and limb darkening may have been factors.

== 1832 Mercury transit ==
The Shuckburgh telescope of the Royal Observatory, Greenwich in London was used for the 1832 transit of Mercury. It was equipped with a micrometer by Dollond and was used for a report of the events as seen through the small refractor. By observing the transit in combination with timing it and taking measures, a diameter for the planet was taken. They also reported the peculiar effects that they compared to pressing a coin into the Sun. The observer remarked:

I afterwards observed, that immediately around the planet there was a dusky tinge, making it appear as if, in a small degree sunk below the sun's surface;

— Royal Astronomical Society, Vol II, No. 13

== Gallery ==
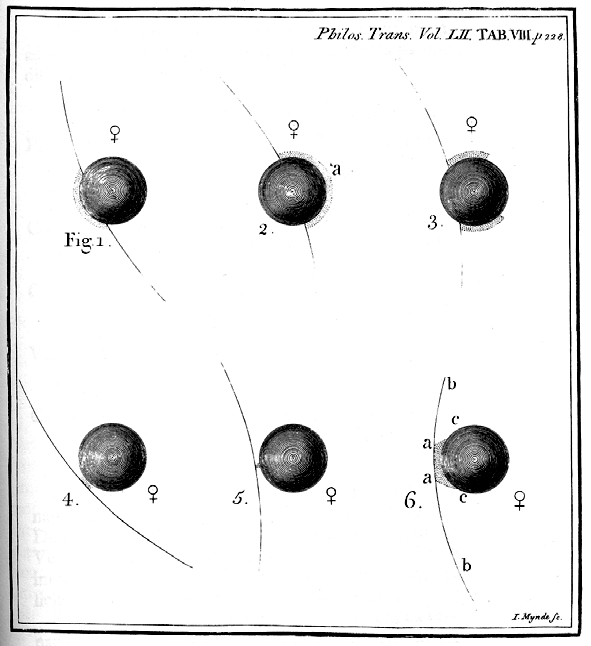
The black drop effect as depicted by Torbern Bergman in 1761.

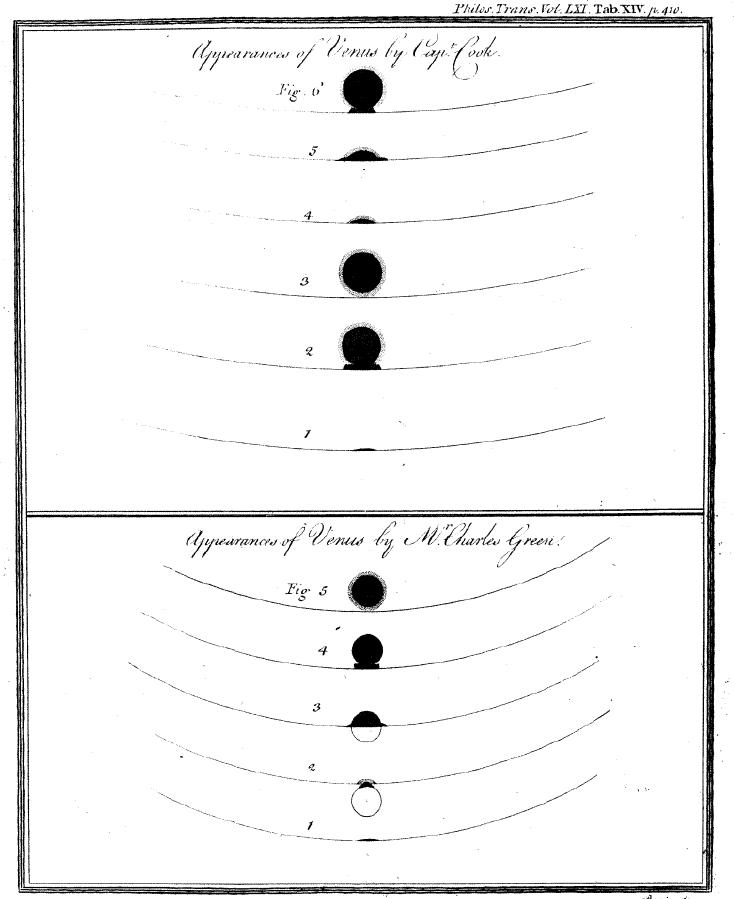
The black drop effect as observed by Captain James Cook and Charles Green in 1771.

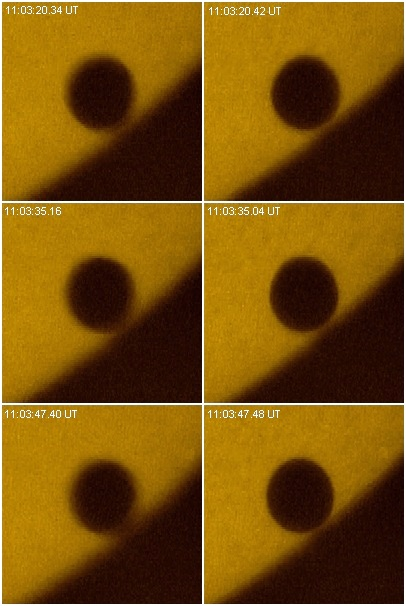
The black drop effect in 2004, in moments of "bad" seeing (left) and "good" seeing (right).

== See also ==
- Shadow blister effect
