= Captain James Cook (miniseries) =

- Written by: Peter Yeldham
- Directed by: Lawrence Gordon Clark
- Starring: Keith Michell; John Gregg
- Theme music composer: José Nieto
- Countries of origin: Australia; France
- Original language: English
- No. of episodes: 4 x 2 hours

Production
- Budget: $12 million

Original release
- Network: ABC
- Release: 6 October 1987 – 1987

Captain James Cook is a 1986 Australian mini series about the life of James Cook (1728–1779), a British explorer, navigator, cartographer, and captain in the British Royal Navy.

The series was financed by $5 million from Revcom France, $2.25 million from the ABC and the rest from 10BA tax money.

== Cast ==
Major characters

- Keith Michell as James Cook
- John Gregg as Joseph Banks
- Erich Hallhuber as John Gore
- Jacques Penot as Charles Clerke
- Steven Grives as Samuel Gibson
- Xabier Elorriaga as Lord Sandwich
- Maurice Risch as William Brougham Munkhouse (ep. 1–2)
- Peter Carroll as Daniel Solander (ep. 1–2)
- Carol Drinkwater as Elizabeth Cook
- Fernando Rey as Admiral Edward Hawke
- Noel Trevarthen as Hugh Palliser (ep. 3)
- Udo Vioff as Johann Reinhold Forster (ep. 3)
- David Whitney as William Bligh (ep. 4)

Secondary cast

- Benjamin Franklin as Alexander Dalrymple (ep. 1–3)
- Barry Quin as Zachary Hicks (ep. 1–2)
- Louise Kimitete as Queen Oberea (ep. 1–3)
- John Dicks as Charles Green (ep. 1–2)
- Nigel Devenport as Henry Jeffs (ep. 1–2)
- Tony Martin as Francis Wilkinson (ep. 1–2)
- Titaine Bourne as Parita
- Te Hare Nui Salmon as Owhaa (ep. 1–3)
- Emil Minty as Young Nick (ep. 1–2)
- Les Foxcroft as Old Salt (ep. 1–2)
- Geoff Morrell as William Perry (ep. 1–3)
- Tim Eliott as Earl of Morton (ep. 1)
- Jeanette Stark as Countess of York (ep. 1)
- Anthony O'Keeffe as William Greenslade (ep. 1)
- Robin Martin as Sydney Parkinson (ep. 1–2)
- Graham Cooke as Lord Exeter (ep. 1)
- John Warnock as Admiralty Secretary (ep. 1)
- Chris Cummings as Clement Webb (ep. 1–2)
- Ross Sharp as Naval Advisor (ep. 1)
- Barry Langrish as Alexander Buchan (ep. 1)
- Auguste Hauata as Tubouri (ep. 1)
- Joseph Tuhetine Tuhipua as Tupia (ep. 2)
- Robert Padwick as Robert Palliser Cooper (ep. 3)
- Rhys McConnochie as King George (ep. 3–4)
- John Polson as Georg Forster (ep. 3)
- John Allen as Tobias Furneaux (ep. 3)
- Isadore Hiro as King Tu (ep. 3–4)
- Jim Holt as John Williamson (ep. 4)
- Tony Harvey as Molesworth Phillips (ep. 4)
- Matthew Crosby as James King (ep. 4)
- Ivanohe Teamotuaitau as Koa (ep. 4)
- Jose Pedro Pua Teao as Palea (ep. 4)
- Christopher Davies as James Cook (ep. 4)
- Darren Messer as Nathaniel Cook (ep. 4)
