= List of crew members aboard the first voyage of James Cook =

Crew of an expiditional voyage by James Cook

The first voyage of James Cook was a discovery expedition to the south Pacific Ocean, with aims of observing the 1769 transit of Venus across the Sun and seeking evidence of the alleged southern territories, named by that time as Terra Australis Incognita. The ship chosen for the voyage was HMS Endeavour. The makeup of the crew during the voyage varied due the high mortality, for which contributed mainly malaria and dysentery, that the crew had contracted in Batavia. There was also one occurrence of successful desertion of Patrick Saunders, who after being disrated, escaped the ship. (Note: In case of his escape James Cook refrained from sending search party, which he normally would commend in similar cases.)

== Personnel ==
The following is a complete list of initial crew that departed from Plymouth on 26 August 1768 according to ship's journal.

Personnel of HMS Endeavour
Name	Rank	Notes	Origin
James Cook	First Lieutenant (Commander)		Marton-in-Cleveland
Zachary Hicks	Second Lieutenant	Died on 26 May 1771	Stepney
John Gore	Third Lieutenant		Colony of Virginia
Robert Molyneux	Master	Died on 16 April 1771	
William Brougham Munkhouse	Surgeon	Died on 05 November 1770	
Charles Clerke	Master’s mate		
Richard Pickersgill	Master’s mate		West Tanfield
Alexander Weir	Master’s mate	Died on 14 September 1768 at Madeira	Fife
Patrick Saunders	Midshipman	Disrated to Able Seaman, then ran in Batavia on 25 December 1770	
Jonathan Munkhouse	Midshipman	Died on 06 February 1771	
John Bootie	Midshipman	Died on 04 February 1771	
Francis Wilkinson	Midshipman		
William Perry	Surgeon’s mate		Chiswick
Richard Orton	Clerk		
John Gathrey	Boatswain	Died on 04 February 1771	
John Satterley	Carpenter	Died on 12 February 1771	
Stephen Forwood	Gunner		
Thomas Hardman	Boatswain’s mate		London
John Reading	Yeoman of sheets	Died on 28 August 1769	Kinsale
Timothy Rearden	Boatswain's mate. Yeoman	Died on 24 December 1770	Cork
Benjamin Jordan	Carpenter’s mate	Died on 31 January 1771	Deptford
George Nowell (Knowel)	Carpenter's crew		
Francis Haite	Carpenter's crew. Yeoman	Died on 30 January 1771	Rochester
Samuel Moody	Carpenter's crew. Yeoman	Died on 30 January 1771	Worcester
Richard Hughes	Carpenter's crew		London
Isaac Johnson	Cooper		Knutsford
John Goodjohn	Cooper's Mate		
William Dawson	Cooper's Steward		Deptford
Robert Stainsby	Capitan's Steward		Dinsdale near Darlington
John Woodworth	Lieutenant’s Steward	Died on 24 December 1770	
William Howson	First Lieutenant’s Steward	Died on 30 November 1770	London
William Harvey	Second Lieutenant’s Steward		London
Nataniel Morey	Third Lieutenant's Steward		
Isaac George Manley	Master’s Servant		
Nicholas Young	Surgeon's Servant		
Thomas Jordan	Boatswain's Servant		
Daniel Roberts	Gunner's Servant	Died on 02 February 1771	
Edward Terrell	Carpenter's Servant		London
John Thompson	Ship's Cook	Died on 31 January 1771	
Thomas Knight	Cook's Servant		
Thomas Matthews	Cook's Boy		
Samuel Evans	Coxswain (Quartermaster)		
Robert Taylor	Armourer		
John Ravenhill	Sailmaker	Died on 26 January 1771	Hull
William Collett	Able Seaman; Barber		High Wycombe
Archibald Wolf (Wolfe)	Able Seaman; Taylor	Died on 31 January 1771	Edinburgh
Henry Jeffs	Able Seaman; Butcher	Died on 27 February 1771	
Forby Sutherland	Able Seaman	Died on 01 May 1770	Orkney
Isaac Smith	Able Seaman		London
Peter Flower	Able Seaman	Died on 02 December 1768	Guernsey
John Ramsay	Able Seaman		Plymouth
Samuel Jones	Able Seaman		London
James Nicholson	Able Seaman	Died on 31 January 1771	Inverness
Issac Parker	Able Seaman		Ipswich
Thomas Simmonds	Able Seaman		London
Robert Anderson	Able Seaman		Inverness
James Gray	Able Seaman		Leith
Matthew Cox	Able Seaman		Gillingham
Richard Hutchins	Able Seaman		
Charles Williams	Able Seaman		Bristol
Joseph Childs	Able Seaman		Dublin
Alexander Simpson	Able Seaman	Died on 21 February 1771	
Henry Stephens	Able Seaman		Falmouth
Thomas Jones	Able Seaman		Bangor
Antonio Ponto	Able Seaman		Venice, Italy
John Dozey	Able Seaman	Died on 07 April 1771	Brazil
James Funley	Able Seaman		Blackwall
Michael Littleboy	Able Seaman		Deptford
William Peckover	Able Seaman		Eyot
James Maria Magra	Able Seaman		New York
Richard Littleboy	Able Seaman		Deptford
John Edgcumbe	Marine Sergeant, Royal Marines		
John Truslove	Marine Corporal, Royal Marines	Died on 24 January 1771	
Thomas Rossiter	Marine Drummer, Royal Marines		
William Judge	Marine Private, Royal Marines		
Henry Paul	Marine Private, Royal Marines		
Daniel Preston	Marine Private, Royal Marines	Died on 15 February 1771	
William Wilshire	Marine Private, Royal Marines		
William Greenslade	Marine Private, Royal Marines	Died on 26 March 1769	
Samuel Gibson	Marine Private, Royal Marines		
Thomas Dunster	Marine Private, Royal Marines	Died on 25 January 1771	
Clement Webb	Marine Private, Royal Marines		
John Bowles	Marine Private, Royal Marines		
Joseph Banks	Naturalist		Revesby Abbey
Daniel Carl Solander	Naturalist		Sweden
Herman Diedrich Spöring	Naturalist	Died on 24 January 1771	Finland
Charles Green	Astronomer	Died on 18 December 1770	Wentworth
John Reynolds	Astronomer's Servant	Died on 18 December 1770	
Sydney Parkinson	Artist	Died on 26 January 1771	Edinburgh
Alexander Buchan	Artist	Died on 17 April 1769	Edinburgh
Herman Diedrich Spöring	Mr Banks’ Secretary	Died on 25 January 1771	
James Roberts	Mr Banks' Servant		Mareham le Fen
Peter Briscoe	Mr Banks' Servant		Revesby Abbey
Thomas Richmond	Mr Banks' Servant	Died on 16 January 1769	
George Dorlton	Mr Banks' Servant	Died on 16 January 1769	

== See also ==
- 1769 transit of Venus observed from Tahiti
- Personnel of Franklin's lost expedition

== Notes and references ==
=== Works cited ===
- Rigby, Nigel; van der Merwe, Pieter (2002). Captain Cook in the Pacific. National Maritime Museum (UK). ISBN 0-948065-43-5.
