= Isaac Smith (Royal Navy officer) =

British Royal Navy officer (1752–1831)

Rear-Admiral Isaac Smith
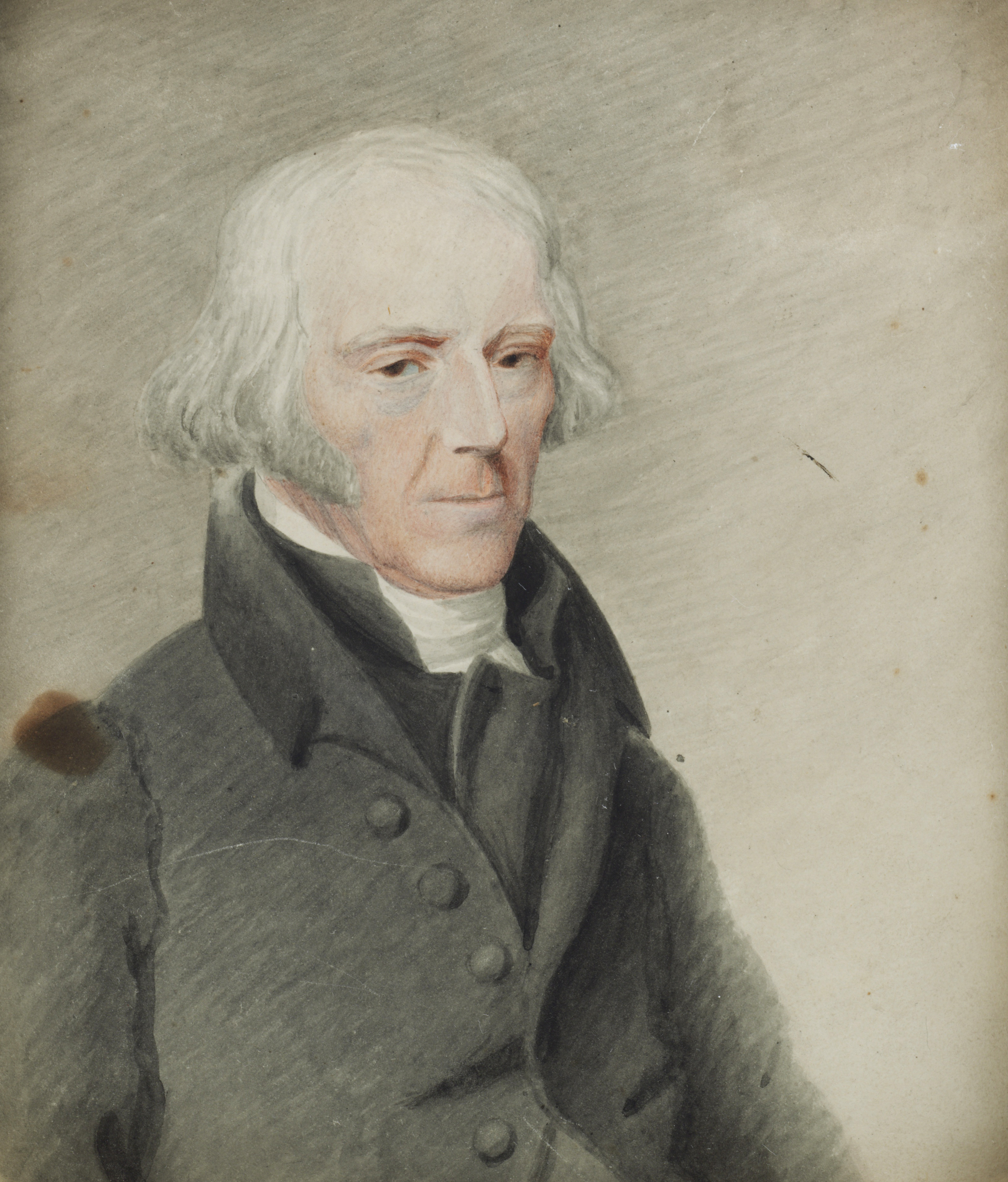
- Admiral Isaac Smith, 1st cousin once-removed of Captain Cook's wife, c. 1815
- Born: 1752
- Died: 1831 (aged 78-79); Merton, Surrey
- Relatives: James Cook
- Military career
- Allegiance: United Kingdom of Great Britain and Ireland
- Branch: Royal Navy
- Service years: 1768–1807
- Rank: Rear-Admiral
- Commands: HMS Weazle; HMS Perseverance
- Conflicts: Capture of Résolue, 1791

Isaac Smith (1752–1831) was a Rear-Admiral in the Royal Navy and cousin of Elizabeth Cook (née Batts) wife of Captain James Cook, with whom he sailed on two voyages of exploration in the South Pacific. Smith was the first European to set foot in eastern Australia and the first to prepare survey maps of various Pacific islands and coastlines including Tierra del Fuego in South America.

== Early life ==
Smith was born in London in 1752, the eldest of seven children of Charles and Hannah Smith and cousin to James Cook's wife Elizabeth. He enlisted for naval service in 1767 at the age of thirteen, using his family connections to secure an immediate ranking of able seaman and a position aboard HMS Grenville under Cook's command, for a survey voyage off the west coast of Newfoundland. On 27 May 1768, and still ranked able seaman, he transferred to his second vessel, Cook's Endeavour, at Deptford ahead of its expedition to the Pacific to observe the 1769 Transit of Venus and then to search the south Pacific for signs of the postulated Terra Australis Incognita (or "unknown southern land").

=== Pacific exploration ===
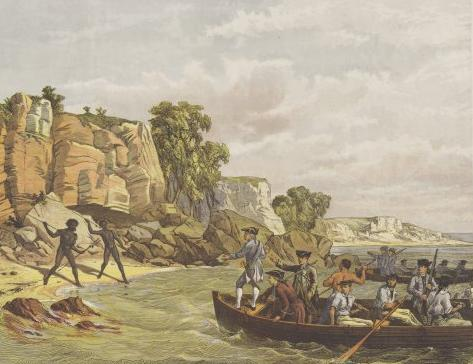
Isaac Smith (second from left in boat, in red coat) preparing to step ashore in Botany Bay, April 1770

Smith sailed with Cook to Tahiti, then to New Zealand and the east coast of Australia. On 28 April 1770 he became the first European to set foot on eastern Australian soil, Cook telling him "Jump out, Isaac" as the ship's boat touched the shore at Botany Bay. A month later on 23 May 1770, Smith was promoted to midshipman following James Magra's suspension on suspicion of having assaulted Cook's clerk.

Cook's lieutenant Zachary Hicks died from tuberculosis in May 1771, and was replaced by the master's mate Charles Clerke. In turn, Smith was promoted to fill Clerke's former role and served with distinction for the remainder of the voyage. Cook singled him out in a letter to the Secretary of the Admiralty in 1772, noting that Smith "had been of great use to me in assisting to make Surveys, Drawings &c in which he is very expert."

Smith sailed again with Cook in 1772, as master's mate aboard HMS Resolution. He assisted first mate Joseph Gilbert in drawing Cook's maps and survey charts during the voyage, including one of the first recorded maps of Tierra del Fuego in 1773. Smith's wider artistic talents were also demonstrated by the production of a small watercolour of icebergs, painted while Resolution sailed close to Antarctica in 1773. On Resolution's return Cook again singled Smith out for praise, advising Admiralty that he was "a Young man bred to the Sea under my care and who has been a very great assistant to me in [making charts], both in this and my former voyage."

=== Independent command ===
On Resolution's return to England in 1775, Smith was promoted to lieutenant and given command of the elderly 16-gun sloop HMS Weazel, holding this post for two years. In December 1787, he was promoted to post-captain in command of the 36-gun frigate HMS Perseverance. The future Admiral John Surman Carden was a member of Smith's crew from 1787 to 1793, before his transfer to HMS Marlborough. As captain of Perseverance, Smith was assigned to the East Indies Station under the overall command of Admiral William Cornwallis and took part in the capture at sea of the French frigate Résolue in 1791 at the Battle of Tellicherry, shortly before the outbreak of the first French Revolutionary War.

== Later life ==
Despite this achievement and continued commendation from his superiors, Smith's active service days were drawing to a close. In 1794 he contracted hepatitis, and his ill health gradually prevented him from performing his duties. In either 1804 or 1807 he applied for and received a promotion to the superannuated post of Rear Admiral and returned to England to retire.

In initial retirement Smith shared a house in Clapham with his cousin, Cook's widow Elizabeth, until in the 1820s he inherited Merton Abbey in Merton, Surrey, from his brother in law. He then divided his time between these two homes, until his death on 2 July 1831 at the age of 78.

His will left a sum of £700 to the church of St Mary the Virgin in Merton, the interest from which was to support the poor of the parish. A memorial to Smith, originally financed by Elizabeth Cook, stands in the church grounds.

== Bibliography ==
- Besant, Walter (2009). Captain Cook. BiblioLife. ISBN 978-1-103-06135-8.
- Beaglehole, J.C., ed. (1968). The Journals of Captain James Cook on His Voyages of Discovery, vol. I:The Voyage of the Endeavour 1768-1771. Cambridge University Press.
- Blainey, Geoffrey (2008). Sea of Dangers. Penguin Group (Australia). ISBN 978-0-670-07223-1.
- Hough, Richard (1994). Captain James Cook. Hodder and Stoughton. ISBN 978-0-340-82556-3.
- Rigby, Nigel; van der Merwe, Pieter (2002). Captain Cook in the Pacific. National Maritime Museum (UK). ISBN 0-948065-43-5.
- Robson, John (2009). Captain Cook's War and Peace: The Royal Navy Years 1755-1768. University of New South Wales Press. p. 23. ISBN 9781742231099.
- Urban, Sylvanus (1831). "Obituary". The Gentleman's Magazine. 51 (24). Parliament Street, London: J. B. Nichols & Son.
