= List of ships of James Cook =

Captain James Cook, FRS, RN (7 November 1728 – 14 February 1779) was a British explorer, navigator, cartographer, and captain in the Royal Navy. Cook made detailed maps of Newfoundland prior to making three voyages to the Pacific Ocean, during which he achieved the first recorded European discovery of eastern Australia, Hawaii and undertook the first circumnavigation of New Zealand.

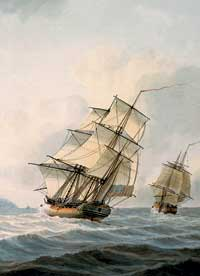
HMS Resolution and HMS Discovery

During his long career he served on a number of British ships.

== Life ==
Cook served his early career in the merchant fleet mostly on colliers. The ships he sailed on were:

- Freelove a collier where Cook served as an apprentice from 26 February 1746 to 22 April 1748.
- Three Brothers he served as apprentice from 14 June 1748 to 8 December 1749.
- Mary of Whitby where he was a seaman from 8 February 1750 to 5 December 1750.
- Three sisters with the rank of seaman from 19 February 1751 to 30 July 1751.
- Friendship serving as a seaman from 31 July 1751 to 14 June 1755.
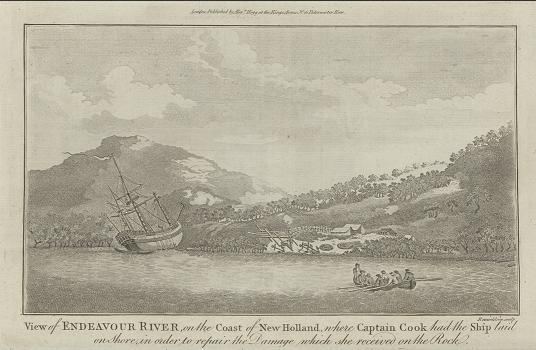
  Endeavour beached at Endeavour River By Johann Fritzsch, 1786.

== Royal Navy career ==
In 1755 he joined the Royal Navy, and served on:

- HMS Eagle,
- HMS Pembroke
- HMS Grenville

=== Command career ===
All four ships were ex-colliers purchased by the Royal Navy as research vessels.

- HMS Endeavour, the only vessel on Cook's First Voyage. Not a ship but a barque. His rank was Commander.
- HMS Adventure Sailed on Cook's Second Voyage, captained by Tobias Furneaux.
- HMS Discovery The support vessel on the Third Voyage. The smallest of Cook's Pacific ships
- HMS Resolution Cook sailed in her twice, but with different escort vessels. His rank was Captain.
