= Voyage of James Cook =

Voyage of James Cook may refer to:

- First voyage of James Cook
- Second voyage of James Cook
- Third voyage of James Cook
