= Fort Granby =

British fort in George Town, Tobago

Fort Granby (11.186°N 60.660°W) was built in Tobago c. 1765 by the British to protect the first capital, George Town. (The capital was moved to Scarborough in 1769.) The fort was probably named for the Marquess of Granby.

The fort was the first British fort on the island, and is the second oldest fort. In 1770 it was the island's main military establishment. A detachment of the 70th (Glasgow Lowland) Regiment of Foot was stationed there and in November was involved in the suppression of a slave revolt. (The rebellion was suppressed later that month after the schooner HMS Grenville brought reinforcements from Barbados.)

The site is on a headland between Barbados and Pinfold Bays. From 1781 to 1793 Tobago was under French control, and the French maintained the fort from 1781 to 1787. At one point the fort was armed with six 6-pounder guns. Thereafter, the fort was abandoned and now little remains of it. The site is a well-kept picnic site that one may reach via Windward Road.
