= John Gore (Royal Navy officer, died 1790) =

British American naval officer and sailor

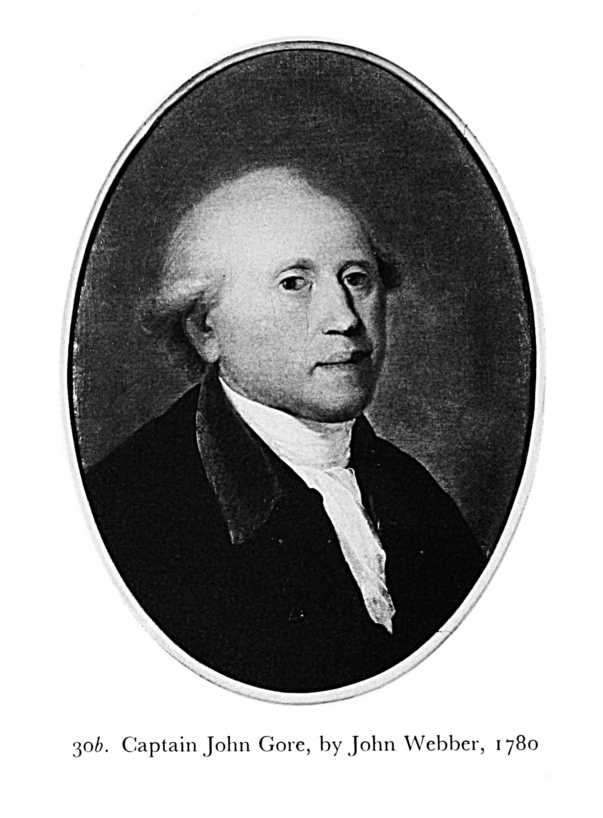
John Gore by John Webber, 1780

Captain John Gore RN (c. 1730–10 August 1790) was a British-American sailor who circumnavigated the globe four times with the Royal Navy in the 18th century and accompanied Captain James Cook in his discoveries in the Pacific Ocean.

== History ==
Although little is known about John Gore before his service with the Royal Navy, it is believed he was born in the British Colony of Virginia in either 1729 or 1730. He first appears in the record books in 1755, joining HMS Windsor at Portsmouth as a midshipman.

Five years later, Gore took his lieutenant's exam and was appointed master's mate of HMS Dolphin. Aboard the Dolphin Gore circumnavigated the globe twice—first under John Byron and then Samuel Wallis. His experience in the Pacific Ocean and on extended navy expeditions led to him being called up to join James Cook's mission to record the Transit of Venus in Tahiti and search for Terra Australis in 1768 aboard HMS Endeavour. On Endeavour, Gore was initially third-in-command (i.e. 3rd Lieutenant) behind Cook (1st Lieutenant) and Zachary Hicks (2nd Lieutenant). After the death of Hicks on the return voyage to England on 26 May 1771, Gore became second-in-command (2nd Lieutenant)

Gore had previously been part of the Royal Navy crew aboard Wallis's Dolphin that had discovered Tahiti and he became valuable to Cook for his knowledge of the island. In 1769 Gore became the first recorded person on the expedition to shoot and kill a person of Māori descent, following an altercation over a piece of cloth as the Endeavour charted the coast of New Zealand. Later, on 14 July 1770 Gore was the first person to shoot and kill a kangaroo (for scientific research) as the expedition made its way up the eastern seaboard of Australia

Returning to England, in 1772, Gore joined the botanist Joseph Banks (who had also been on Cook's first Pacific voyage) in a private scientific expedition to Iceland and the Hebrides. Gore and Banks may have become friends as evidence shows that Banks was the executor of Gore's will. The trip did not return until after Cook had sailed on his second Pacific voyage.

In 1776, Gore joined HMS Resolution as first lieutenant for Cook's third voyage. As the Resolution explored the Pacific in search of the famed Northwest Passage, Gore would sight the American continent of his birth from the west coast. Later, following Cook's death in Hawaii, Charles Clerke, captain of Resolution's sister ship HMS Discovery took command. Gore then assumed command of Discovery in Clerke's place. When Clerke died shortly after, Gore took responsibility for the entire expedition and brought the ships home to England on 4 October 1780, more than a year after assuming command. He was formally promoted to the post of captain on 2 October 1780.

In recognition of his achievements John Webber, who had previously painted Cook, took Gore's portrait as the navy made him an honorary post-captain. Moving further in the footsteps of Cook, in 1780 the Admiralty appointed him as one of the captains of the Greenwich Hospital, where he took the late Captain's vacant rooms. He served there for the final 10 years of his life.

In 1790, having circumnavigated the globe four times, he died on 10 August.

== Legacy ==
Gore was succeeded by a son, John (born 1772) who was also a Royal Navy Officer, who reached the rank of captain on 19 July 1821, retiring in that rank on 1 October 1846, later promoted to Retired Rear Admiral on 8 March 1852 and dying in 1853. He moved to Australia in 1834 as one of the first free settlers. Little is known of his mother (John Gore senior's wife), Ann Gore, although she is known to have received a Royal Navy widow's pension from 1790. His son (that is, John Gore senior's grandson), Graham Gore, continued the expeditionary heritage, perishing in John Franklin's ill-fated attempt to navigate the Northwest Passage, nearly 70 years after his grandfather had attempted the same.

Gore Point and the Gore Peninsula in the Alaskan Kenai fjords were named for John Gore by Captain Nathaniel Portlock, a fellow veteran of Cook's third voyage who explored the Pacific Northwest of America in the late 18th century. There are also several Australian and New Zealand sites named after John Gore.

== Bibliography ==
- The Endeavour journal (1) and The Endeavour journal (2), as kept by James Cook – digitised and held by the National Library of Australia
- Oxford Dictionary of National Biography
- The Quiet Mariner by Johanna Parker (Curator, National Archives of Australia) at the Captain Cook Society
- John Gore's Young One and John Gore's Young One – an update by Madge Darby and Cliff Thornton at the Captain Cook Society
- The Life of John Ledyard, the American Traveller by Jared Sparks (1829) Hilliard & Brown, pages 76–77
- Exploring Alaska's Kenai Fjords by David Wm Miller (2004) Wilderness Images ISBN 0-9613954-1-9
- The Men who sailed with Captain James Cook
- Sides, Hampton (2024). The Wide Wide Sea: Imperial Ambition, First Contact, and the Fateful Final Voyage of Captain James Cook. Doubleday. ISBN 9780385544764.
