= HMS Discovery (1774) =

Sailing ship best known for James Cook's third voyage

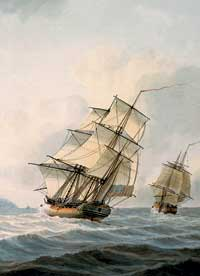
- Resolution and Discovery by Samuel Adkin

History

Great Britain
- Name: HMS Discovery
- Builder: Langbourne, Whitby
- Launched: 1774 (as the collier Diligence)
- Acquired: January 1776
- Commissioned: February 1776
- Fate: Broken up at Chatham Dockyard in October 1797

General characteristics
- Class & type: 8-gun discovery ship
- Tons burthen: 299 bm
- Length: 91 ft 6 in (27.89 m)
- Beam: 27 ft 6 in (8.38 m)
- Draught: 11 ft 5 in (3.48 m)
- Propulsion: sails
- Sail plan: brig, later full-rigged
- Complement: 70 as transport
- Armament: 8 guns:

HMS Discovery was the consort ship of James Cook's third expedition to the Pacific Ocean in 1776–1780. Like Cook's other ships, Discovery was a Whitby-built collier originally named Diligence when she was built in 1774. Purchased in 1775, the vessel was measured at 299 tons burthen. Originally a brig, Cook had her changed to a full-rigged ship. She was commanded by Charles Clerke, who had previously served on Cook's first two expeditions, and had a complement of 70. After Cook was killed in a skirmish following his attempted kidnapping of Hawaiian leader Kalaniʻōpuʻu, Clerke transferred to the expedition's flagship HMS Resolution and John Gore assumed command of Discovery. She returned to Britain under the command of Lieutenant James King, arriving back on 4 October 1780.

After returning to the Nore in 1780, Discovery was fitted out as a transport at Woolwich Dockyard, serving as such between December 1780 and May 1781. She then became a dockyard craft at Woolwich, and was broken up at Chatham Dockyard in October 1797.

The ship is the main namesake for the United States National Aeronautics and Space Administration Space Shuttle Orbiter Discovery.

== See also ==
- European and American voyages of scientific exploration
- Age of Discovery
