= Zachary Hickes =

British Royal Navy officer who sailed with James Cook

Zachary Hicks
- Born: 1739; Stepney, England
- Died: May 26, 1771 (aged 31–32); St Helena
- Military career
- Allegiance: Kingdom of Great Britain; Britain
- Branch: Royal Navy
- Service years: 1766–1771
- Rank: Lieutenant
- Commands: Second-in-command, HMS Endeavour 1768–1771

Zachary Hicks (1739 – 26 May 1771) was a Royal Navy officer, second-in-command on Lieutenant James Cook's first voyage to the Pacific and the first among Cook's crew to sight mainland Australia. A dependable officer who had risen swiftly through the ranks, Hicks conducted liaison and military duties for Cook, including command of shore parties in Rio de Janeiro and the kidnapping of a Tahitian chieftain in order to force indigenous assistance in the recovery of deserters. Hicks' quick thinking while in temporary command of HMS Endeavour also saved the lives of Cook, Joseph Banks and Daniel Solander when they were attacked by Māori in New Zealand in November 1769.

Yet despite his vigorous service Hicks was dogged by ill health, which worsened as the voyage progressed. He died in May 1771 of a consumptive illness likely contracted before sailing from England, and his remains were buried at sea off the Atlantic island of Saint Helena. New Zealand's Hicks Bay and eastern Australia's Point Hicks are named in his honour.

Zachary's surname was usually, but not always, spelt Hicks in the journals of Cook and Banks. The family used the spelling Hickes, and Zachary's commission has that spelling.

== Early life and naval service ==
Hicks was born in Stepney in 1739. He enlisted or was pressed into military service at Ripon and first appears in navy muster-books as serving as able seaman and master's mate aboard HMS Launceston from 1766. A skilled seaman, he was promoted to midshipman aboard the sloop HMS Hornet in August 1767, and to acting lieutenant on the same vessel in March 1768. His officer's commission was formalised on 26 May 1768 with a transfer to James Cook's HMS Endeavour as second lieutenant and second-in-command.

== Aboard Endeavour ==
=== Outward voyage ===
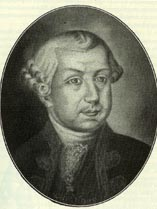
Portuguese viceroy Antônio Rolim de Moura, on whose authority Hicks was detained in Rio de Janeiro

Hicks' early months aboard Endeavour were uneventful. He is not mentioned in the journals of either Cook or the Royal Society supernumeraries Joseph Banks and Sydney Parkinson until Endeavour reached the Portuguese port of Rio de Janeiro on 13 November 1768. There Hicks was given his first specific duties by Cook: to put ashore in command of the ship's pinnace, to make contact with local authorities and to seek permission to replenish the ship's supplies. The engagement did not go well, as the Portuguese viceroy Antônio Rolim de Moura refused to believe that Endeavour was on a scientific mission. Instead, Hicks and master's mate Charles Clerke were detained on shore while answers were sought from Cook regarding his vessel, armaments and number of crew. The pinnace was returned to Endeavour without Hicks, and he and Clerke were only permitted to return to their ship after some hours' delay.

On 19 November Hicks was again sent ashore, to present a letter from Cook to the viceroy. On arrival at Rio's docks he objected when a Portuguese soldier boarded his boat and refused to leave, at which point he and his crew were arrested and taken under guard from the shore. Portuguese authorities confiscated Endeavour's pinnace and imprisoned the crew, sending Hicks back to his ship alone. After formal protests from Cook, Hicks' crew was released and the vessel returned but without its ensign flag which the Portuguese suggested had been lost. Portuguese authorities accused Hicks of threatening their soldiers' lives and of displaying "petulancy and imprudence"; they asked that he be confined to Endeavour and not return to shore. However Cook considered that Hicks had offered no provocation to Portuguese authorities that would justify their depriving him of his boat and command.

=== Pacific exploration ===
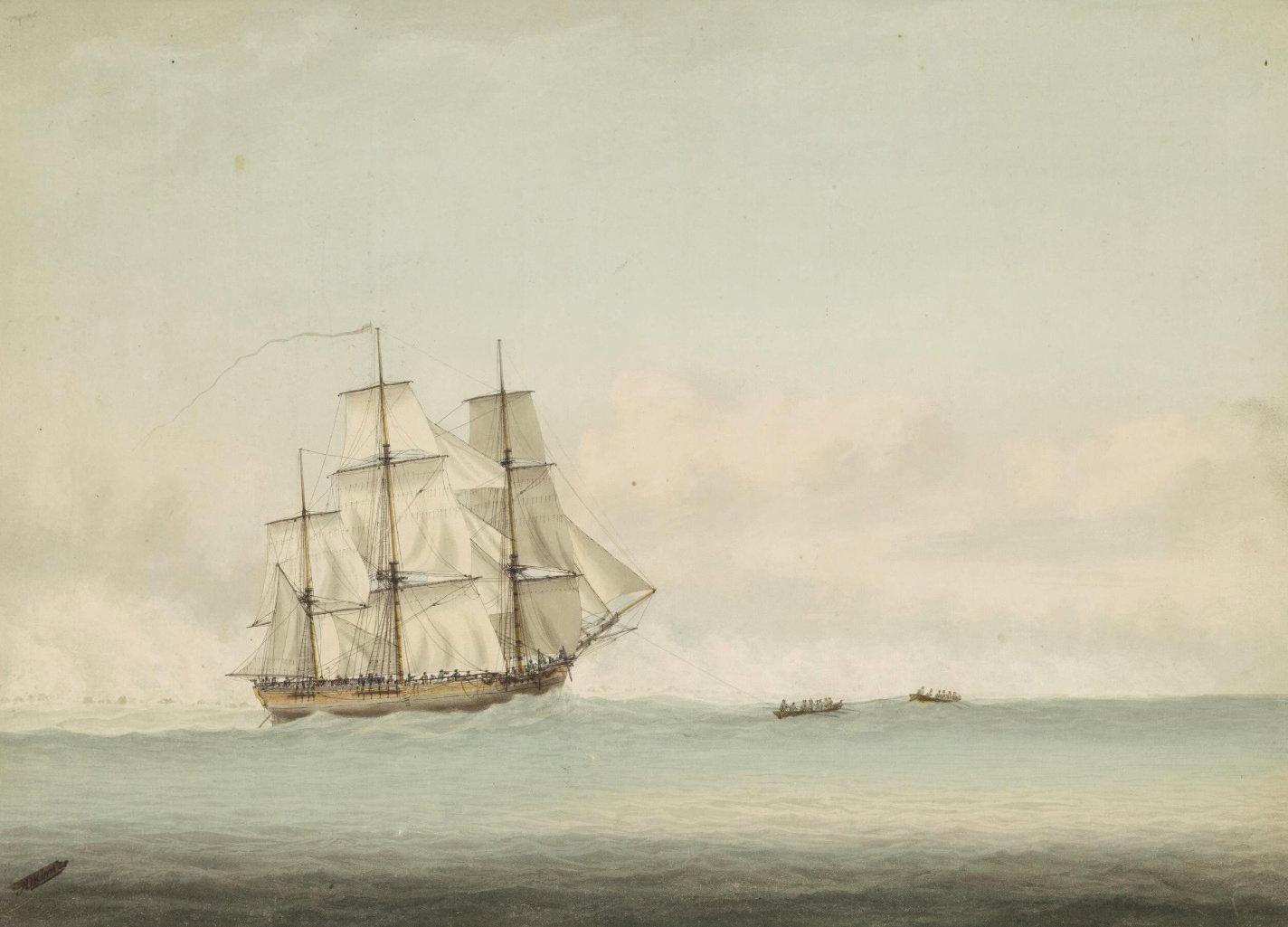
Hicks' ship, HMS Endeavour off the coast of New Holland. By Samuel Atkins c. 1794

Departing Rio, Endeavour rounded Cape Horn and continued westward across the Pacific to reach Tahiti in April 1769. Hicks' abilities as a leader were tested when, three days before Endeavour was due to depart, two of her marines deserted to the mountains to stay with their Tahitian "wives". Cook deputised Hicks to secure their return, ordering him to kidnap local chief Tootaha and three others in order to force the Tahitians to reveal where the deserters were hiding. The kidnapping was a success but the stratagem failed; the Tahitians responded by abducting Endeavour's surgeon William Monkhouse and four of her crew, and holding them hostage near the shore. Again Cook turned to Hicks, who led a strong detachment of marines to the shore and threatened that "the Chiefs would suffer for it" if the hostages were not freed. Hicks' threat succeeded – Monkhouse and the sailors were released, the Tahitians found and returned the deserters, and all were restored to Endeavour along with a peace offering of four pigs.

On 3 June Cook chose Hicks as one of the six men designated to record the Transit of Venus upon which Endeavour's voyage was ostensibly based. Hicks joined First Mate Richard Pickersgill and Second Mate Charles Clerke on the eastward side of the island to time the beginning and end of the transit, but their figures did not match those of other observers. A disappointed Cook was forced to record the differing figures and settle on an average between them.

Departing Tahiti, Hicks travelled onward with Endeavour into the uncharted waters of the South Pacific. He was credited with locating Hicks Bay in New Zealand, and then with being the first to see the mainland of Australia near today's Point Hicks (land was sighted on his morning watch). Cook recorded both those names after him.

Endeavour made landfall in Botany Bay in eastern Australia on 29 April 1770. After the initial landing by Cook, Hicks was given command of the shore party with responsibility for collecting water and wood to resupply the ship. In this role Hickes made the expedition's first sustained contact with indigenous Australians when more than a dozen gathered on the beach to watch his men collect water. Cook observed in his journal that "Mister Hicks did all in his power to entice them to him by offering them presents and company but it was to no purpose, all they seem'd to want was for us to be gone." Hickes nonetheless persisted, with sufficient interaction over the following days for him to interpret a few words of the indigenous language. (Note: In a note dated 2 May 1770, Isaac Smith, able seaman aboard Endeavour, recorded that Hicks had given him the following translations of indigenous speech: "boorwee" meaning three; "warregal" meaning dog; "mareeyang" meaning large bird; "mayanga" meaning to fly; "gong" meaning sun; "eednarda" meaning moon; "padoo" meaning water; "bemalle" meaning earth; and "gooiyong" meaning fire.)

=== Death ===
Hickes died of a consumptive lung infection on 26 May 1771, the third anniversary of his commission as lieutenant aboard Endeavour. As Cook recorded in his journal, the cause of Hickes' death was "a Consumption of which he was not free from when we saild from England so that it may be truly said that he hath been dieing ever sence, though he held out tolerable well until we got to Batavia." His remains were buried at sea off the South Atlantic island of Saint Helena, with what Cook described as "the usual ceremonies."

== Memorials ==
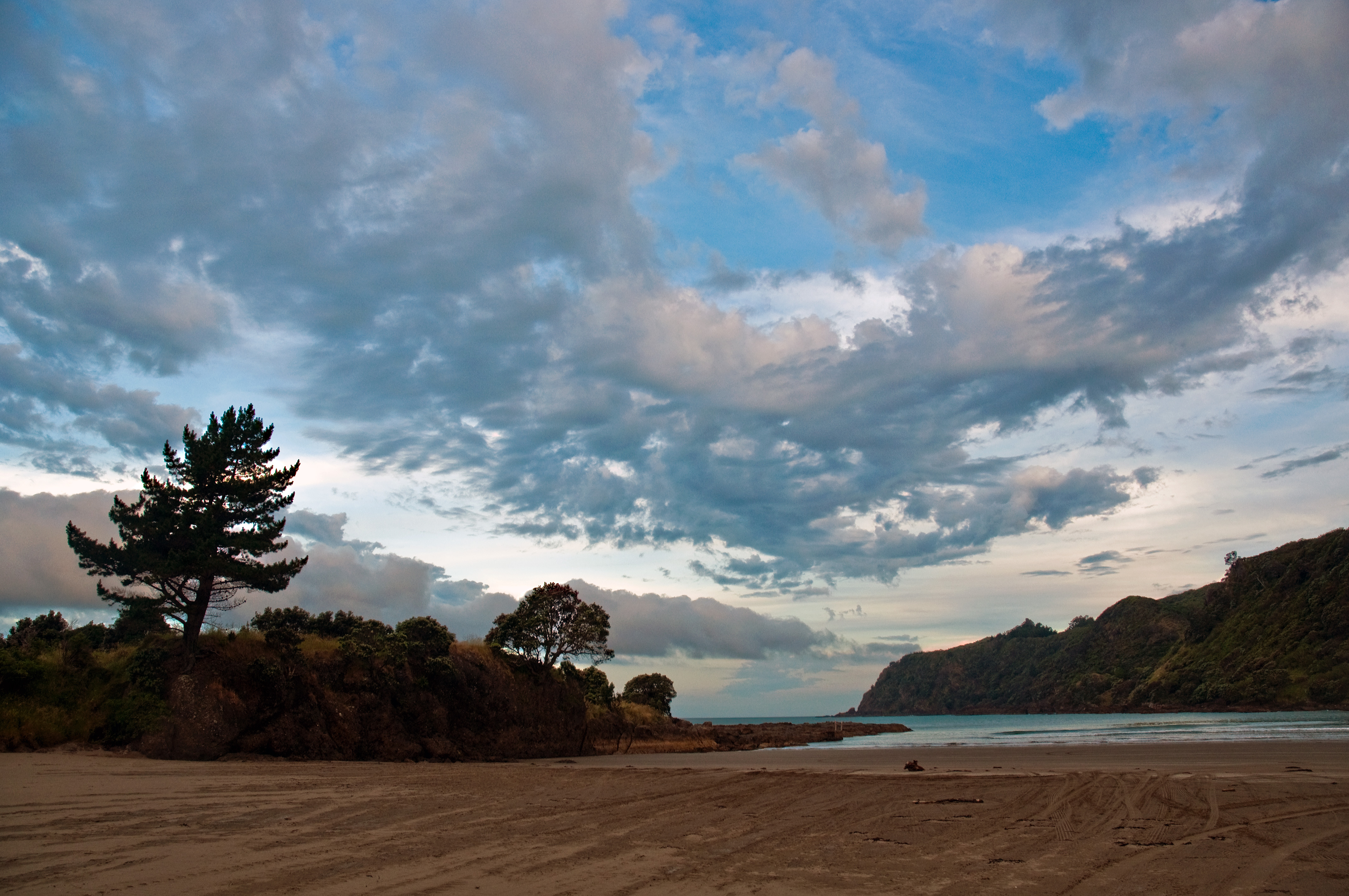
Hicks Bay on New Zealand's east coast. First sighted by Zachary Hicks from Endeavour's deck, 31 October 1769

As an officer, Hicks was well regarded but not exceptional. Historian J. C. Beaglehole describes him as "a man of ability" but without "the chance to shine ... an invaluable man, probably, on any expedition; but perhaps born to be a lieutenant."

He is memorialised in the inscription on a monument at Point Hicks, which reads, "Lieutenant James Cook, R.N. of the Endeavour, first sighted Australia near this point which he named Point Hicks, after Lieutenant Zachary Hicks who first saw the land." A matching inscription is affixed to the monument at the site of Cook's former cottage in Great Ayton in North Yorkshire. A street crescent in the Melbourne suburb of Endeavour Hills bears the name Zachary Hicks Crescent.

== Notes ==
=== References ===
- Beaglehole, J.C., ed. (1968). The Journals of Captain James Cook on His Voyages of Discovery, vol. I:The Voyage of the Endeavour 1768–1771. Cambridge University Press. OCLC 223185477.
- Collingridge, Vanessa (2002). Captain Cook. Random House. ISBN 0091879132.
- Hough, Richard (1995). Captain James Cook. Hodder and Stoughton. ISBN 978-0-340-82556-3.
