= HMS Grenville (1763) =

Ship used by James Cook to survey Newfoundland

Great Britain
- Name: Grenville
- Builder: Unknown, Massachusetts Bay
- Laid down: 1754
- Launched: 1754 as American merchant vessel Sally
- Acquired: 7 August 1763
- Commissioned: 1764
- Decommissioned: March 1775
- In service: 1764-1775
- Fate: Broken up at Deptford Dockyard, March 1775

General characteristics
- Class & type: 12-gun schooner, later brig
- Tons burthen: 6776/94 bm
- Length: 54 ft 11 in (16.7 m) (gundeck); 43 ft 1 in (13.1 m) (keel)
- Beam: 17 ft 2.5 in (5.2 m)
- Depth of hold: 7 ft 4 in (2.2 m)
- Sail plan: schooner, re-rigged as brig
- Complement: 20
- Armament: 12 × 3-pdrs; 12 × 1/2-pdr swivel guns

HMS Grenville, was a 12-gun schooner, and later brig, of the Royal Navy which saw service as a survey vessel under the command of James Cook from 1764–1773, and as a troop transport from 1773–1774.

== Construction ==
The vessel was built in Massachusetts Bay in 1754 as a merchant ship Sally. As constructed, she 54 ft 11 in (16.7 m) long with a 43 ft 1 in (13.1 m) keel, a beam of 17 ft 2.5 in (5.245 m) and a hold depth of 7 ft 4 in (2.2 m). She was of 67 76/94 tons burthen.

In the summer of 1763 Sally was purchased by the Governor of Newfoundland, Thomas Graves for use as a survey vessel along the coast of Newfoundland and Labrador. The purchase was significantly in advance of Admiralty approval for the acquisition, which was granted nearly a year later on 3 July 1764. On receipt of this approval the vessel was renamed Grenville in honour of British Prime Minister George Grenville and commissioned under ship's master James Cook. This would be Cook's first independent command.

== Naval service ==
Initially, Sally operated as a tender to HMS Antelope, with her crew, including James Cook, on the muster books of the larger ship. Nevertheless, Cook operated the schooner independently. Having just completed the survey of Saint Pierre and Miquelon in the diplomatically fragile delay of the handover to the French, (Note: This survey was carried out from HMS Tweed, with the newly arrived French governor being persuaded to delay taking over the islands. This was to allow the British time to survey the territory that they were handing over to the French – a remnant of their former possessions, from which French fishermen could operate, as agreed in the Treaty of Paris (1763).) at the end of July 1763, Cook set off to start surveying Quirpon and Noddy Harbours in the north of Newfoundland. As the surveying season came to a close, Cook returned to St John's in late September, where the ship was laid up for the winter. Cook was sent back to London to work on fair copies of his charts. The new Governor of Newfoundland, Hugh Palliser (who knew Cook well), suggested that Grenville could work more efficiently if she had her own complement, rather than operating as a tender to a larger vessel. This would allow her to return to a dockyard in Britain for refitting and to sail for Newfoundland fully supplied and ready to work. This was put into effect by the Navy Board on 2 May 1764. At the start of the 1764 season, Cook and his crew took possession of Grenville in St John's on 14 June and at the end of that year's work, sailed her across the Atlantic to Deptford.

Thereafter, for each summer season of Cook's command, Grenville sailed from Deptford to Newfoundland and Labrador to survey the coastal waters. Much of the area that he covered in Newfoundland had not been surveyed in any way beforehand. Cook employed new surveying techniques, using shore-based theodolites to record the position of a ship's boat that made a running survey of depths. This avoided many of the inaccuracies of calculating the position of the surveying boat from a ship whose position might not be accurately known.

On the morning of 6 August 1764 a powder horn exploded in Cook's hand while he was on shore with his survey tools. The explosion caused a wound at Cook's right hand from thumb to wrist, which was beyond the skills of Grenville's 20-man crew to repair. The ship's boat was therefore detailed to ferry Cook to Noddy Bay, where the crew approached a French fishing ship for aid. A surgeon aboard that vessel dressed Cook's wound, with the ship's boat returning him to Grenville that evening.

At the conclusion of the northern summer Grenville was sailed to Deptford Dockyard to be refitted as a brig. This was at Cook's request. Among other advantages, the greater manoeuvrability of a brig was important for surveying work. Most importantly, the ability to back a square sail enabled the ship to be quickly stopped if a hazard was spotted close ahead. Refitting works were substantial, lasting from December 1764 to April 1765 at a final cost of £1,145.17s. On completion of works Grenville was returned to Newfoundland.

On 23 July 1765, whilst surveying in Fortune Bay, Grenville grounded on some hidden rocks at the entrance to an inlet. The ship was stuck fast on her forefoot. Stores, ballast and the guns had to be unloaded before the tide floated her free, and the forefoot needed some repair before crossing the Atlantic at the end of the season. This sole mishap to the ship whilst surveying in unknown and hazardous waters is considered to be a "remarkable record". Over the following winter, Cook obtained the permission of the Admiralty to make greater use of hiring local fishermen to "point out hidden dangers".

In 1766, Cook was able to make an exact fix of longitude from observations of a solar eclipse.

At the end of the 1767 surveying season, as in other years, Cook sailed Grenville back to Deptford. Encountering a "hard storm" (in Cook's words) in the entrance to the Thames, Cook anchored off the Nore lighthouse. The yards and topmasts were struck (Note: "Striking" a topmast means to lower it down to a stowed position on the lower mast. This reduces the windage on the rig. In the incident with Grenville, Cook's accounts states that the topmasts and yards were later sent down to the deck, so getting them to an even lower position, further reducing windage aloft and lowering the centre of gravity of the spars.) to reduce the effect of the wind on the anchored ship, but the cable to the largest anchor broke, she dragged the second anchor and went aground on a shoal. By midnight, with the storm continuing and the ship hard aground and listing, Cook and his crew abandoned in the boats and went ashore. As the storm abated, with assistance from the Navy yard in Sheerness, Cook and his crew returned to Grenville and lightened her by throwing overboard ballast and any unnecessary material. After two days, she was afloat again and being refitted with the necessary spars to re-rig the ship so that she could be taken into Deptford.

In 1768, Cook left Grenville to begin his first circumnavigation of the world on HMS Endeavour.

In 1770 Grenville brought troops to Tobago from Barbados and they, together with troops from Fort Granby, helped suppress a slave rebellion.

The ship was broken up in March 1775.
