= Third voyage of James Cook =

Royal Navy exploration voyage to the North Pacific from 1776 to 1780

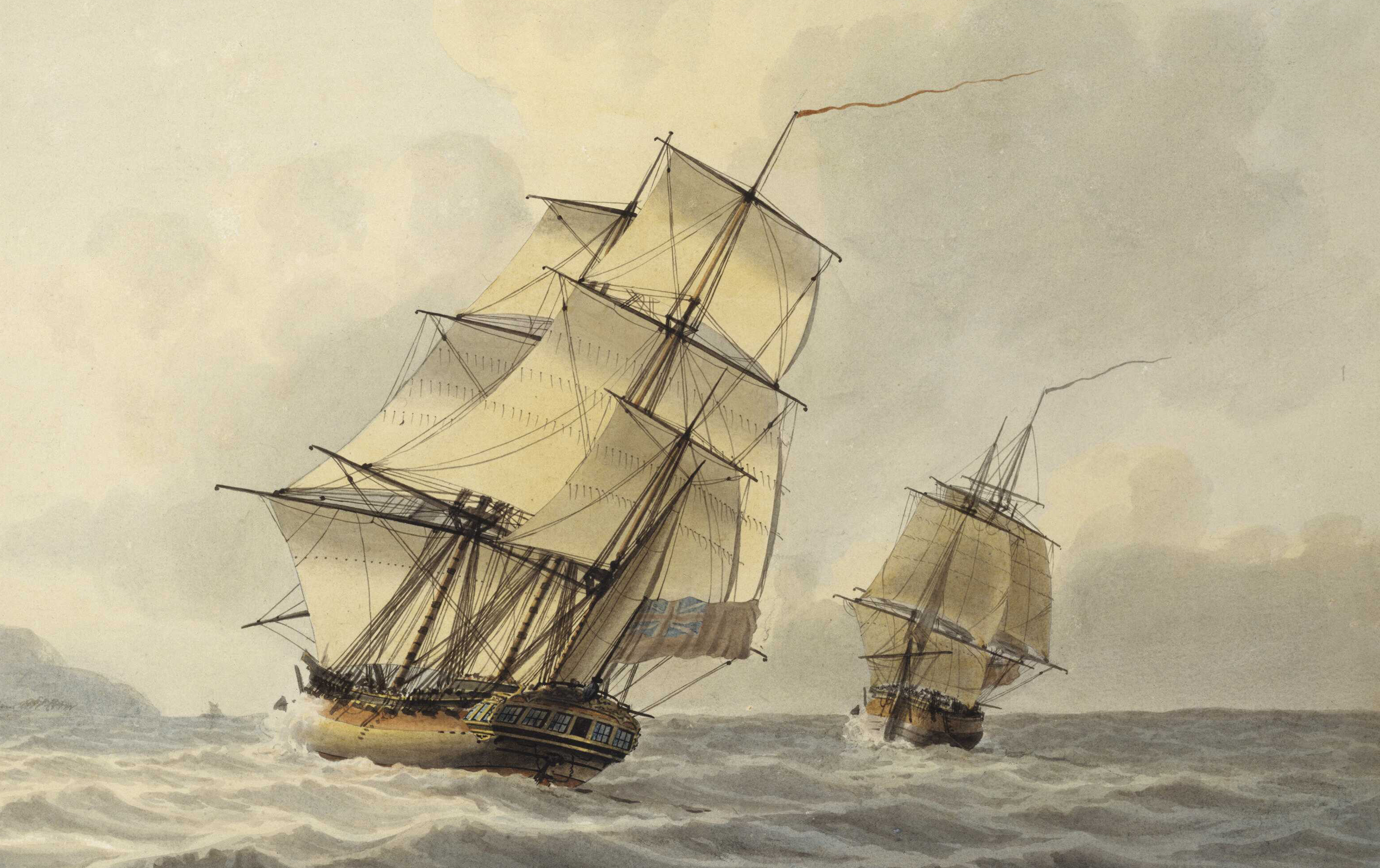
- Resolution' and 'Discovery' off the coast of Tahiti
- Sponsor: Royal Navy
- Country: United Kingdom
- Leader: James Cook
- Start: Plymouth; 12 July 1776
- End: Nore; 4 October 1780
- Goal: finding the north-west passage, bring home Omai
- Ships: HMS Resolution, HMS Discovery
- Crew: 182 (112 Resolution), (70 Discovery)
- Fatalities: 30

Route
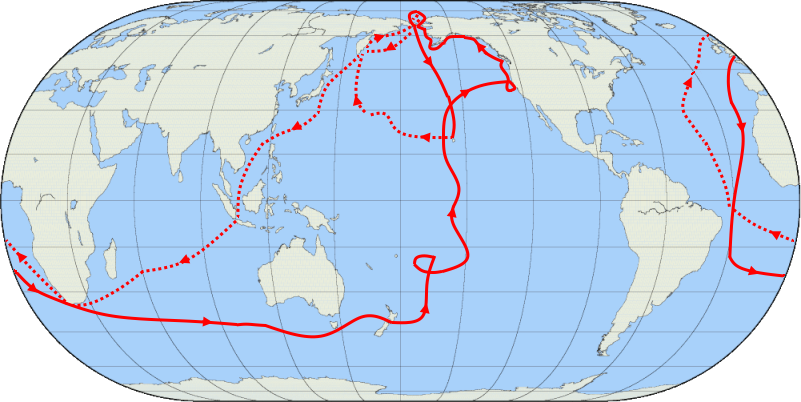

James Cook's third and final voyage (12 July 1776 – 4 October 1780) was a British attempt to discover the Northwest Passage between the Atlantic ocean and the Pacific coast of North America. The attempt failed and Cook was killed at Hawaii in a violent dispute with the local inhabitants. The ostensible purpose of the voyage was to return Omai, a young man from Raiatea, to his homeland, but the British Admiralty used this as a cover for their plan to send Cook on a voyage to find the Northwest Passage, should it exist. HMS Resolution, to be commanded by Cook, and HMS Discovery, commanded by Charles Clerke, were prepared for the voyage which started from Plymouth in 1776.

After Omai was returned to his homeland, the ships sailed into the central Pacific where they encountered the hitherto unknown (to Europeans) Hawaiian Archipelago, before reaching the Pacific coast of North America. After exploring and charting the northwest coast of the continent, they passed through the Bering Strait into the Arctic Ocean where they were eventually blocked by pack ice. The vessels returned to the Pacific and called briefly at the Aleutians before Cook decided to return to the Hawaiian Islands for the winter. At Kealakekua Bay, off the island of Hawaii, a number of quarrels broke out between the British and Hawaiians culminating in Cook's death in a violent exchange on 14 February 1779. The command of the expedition was assumed by Charles Clerke who again failed to find the Northwest Passage before his own death from tuberculosis. Under the command of John Gore the crews returned to London in October 1780.

== Conception ==
Upon his return from the second voyage, James Cook received considerable recognition in Britain. He was promoted to the rank of post-captain and subsequently appointed Fourth captain of Greenwich Hospital with a pension of £230 per year. Cook soon found himself unsatisfied with a quiet life. He missed the intellectual challenges of exploration. He felt confined by his new circumstances, as shown in his own words about moving from the vastness of the Southern Hemisphere to the restricted space of his home. Although he admitted the post offered comfort and a good income, he was uncertain whether he could adapt to a life of ease and retirement.

By this time, Cook was nearly forty-seven years old. He suffered from a short temper, ongoing digestive issues, and possibly a diseased gall-bladder. Years at sea had left him physically and emotionally tired. The search for the Northwest Passage promised new opportunity. This sea route, if it existed, was believed to provide access to the trading nations of Asia. The belief in such a passage was built on scientific misunderstandings, including the notion that sea water could not freeze. Many scholars thought that ice at sea must come from rivers on land, so without nearby landmasses, the seas would be open and navigable. Cook’s own observations in Antarctica had challenged these ideas, but his findings were not yet widely published or accepted. Attempts to find the Northwest Passage had a long history.

The first British effort came in 1497 with John Cabot. Over the next 250 years, explorers made about fifty attempts using routes such as the St. Lawrence, Hudson Bay, and Davis Strait. None succeeded, and many ships did not return. When Cook returned in 1775, preparations for another attempt were already underway. Lawmakers and Admiralty officials moved to renew a 1745 Act offering a large prize of £20,000 for the discovery of the Passage. Another reason for the voyage was the Admiralty's intention to send Omai, a young Polynesian from Raiatea who had been brought to England in 1774 by Tobias Furneaux, back home.

== Preparation and personnel ==
Initially the Admiralty had wanted Charles Clerke to lead the expedition, with Cook, acting as a consultant. During a dinner on 9 January with the First Lord of the Admiralty, Lord Sandwich, Cook stated while discussing the selection of officers that he would lead the voyage himself.

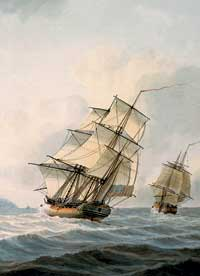
Resolution and Discovery

The Resolution under Cook sailed with a crew of 112, while the Discovery commanded by Clerke carried 70. Both ships drew from a group of officers with experience in exploration. The lieutenants from the previous voyage had been promoted to commanders. Clerke was notably the only officer to join all three expeditions under Cook. At 33, Clerke had matured since the first voyage. He gained technical skills, became a reliable officer, and was known for his sense of duty, though he lacked training as a surveyor. He was sociable, generous, and had strong relationships with colleagues, but suffered personal financial difficulties, which once left him imprisoned for debt.

John Gore, an experienced circumnavigator and the oldest officer after Cook, became first lieutenant of the Resolution. He had previously missed out on promotion due to absence on another venture. Gore was practical, dependable, sometimes speculative, and often reserved in his journal-keeping, but showed occasional creativity in naming places. James King joined as second lieutenant of the Resolution. He was in his mid-twenties, with both naval and political connections. King had a strong academic background, including scientific studies in Paris and Oxford, which made him well-suited for his responsibilities with navigational instruments. King’s character and intellect earned him respect among officers and crew, and he was sometimes mistaken for Cook’s son in Hawaii due to their close working relationship.

John Williamson became third lieutenant of the Resolution. He was generally disliked by his peers. His temperament was marked by self-righteousness and a tendency to anger, which did not fit well with the demands of the voyage. William Bligh, at age 21, became master of the Resolution after six years of naval service. He was recognised for his skill as a surveyor and draughtsman. Bligh helped train younger crew members and was considered competent, though his later career revealed a tendency for strong judgements and difficulty in forming friendships. The Resolution’s master’s mates included Henry Roberts, noted for his talent in journal illustration; William Harvey, who had served on both the Resolution and the Endeavour; and William Lanyon, who had served on the Adventure.

James Burney was first lieutenant of the Discovery. He came from a well-connected family and had prior experience on the American station. Burney’s partnership with Clerke proved effective, and his observational skills were an asset. John Rickman was second lieutenant of the Discovery. Little is known about him apart from his later involvement in tragic events and his anonymous account of the voyage. Thomas Edgar, the Discovery’s master, was diligent in keeping journals and charts. He demonstrated capable seamanship and conscientiousness. His mates included Nathaniel Portlock, who would later help develop the north-west American fur trade, and Alexander Home, who pursued a Scottish title after retiring.

Among the midshipmen, several would later distinguish themselves. James Trevenen of the Resolution, Edward Riou, and George Vancouver of the Discovery all went on to notable careers. Trevenen wrote vivid accounts of the voyage. Riou died as a captain under Nelson at Copenhagen. Vancouver later became a prominent marine surveyor and wrote extensively about his experiences under Cook. Molesworth Phillips was the only marine officer, serving with the Resolution. He was young and had switched from the navy to the marines on Joseph Banks’s advice. Phillips formed a friendship with James Burney during the voyage. The expedition included six medical officers and assistants. William Anderson, promoted to surgeon of the Resolution, was noted for his medical and natural history knowledge as well as his linguistic skills. He provided scientific support and was esteemed by Cook. David Samwell, Anderson’s first mate, was a competent surgeon with literary and social interests. He documented lighter aspects of the voyage and was an admirer of Cook. William Ellis, the surgeon’s second mate in the Discovery, was educated at Cambridge and contributed to the ship’s scientific work.

Along with the official crew there were also several supernumeraries on the voyage. Omai resided on the Resolution as a passenger. He felt sadness upon leaving England but excitement regarding his homecoming. His personal cargo included port wine and gunpowder. He also carried muskets, bullets, a suit of armour, and a hand-organ. Cook disapproved of giving Omai firearms. Cook believed Omai would eventually miss England once he arrived home. The captain intended to leave before Omai could change his mind. John Webber also sailed on the Resolution as the official artist.

He was 24 years old and the son of a Swiss sculptor. Webber received his training in Berne and Paris. Daniel Solander noticed his work at the Royal Academy. The Admiralty hired him based on this recommendation. Webber produced a high volume of drawings during the trip. He focused on botanical accuracy and landscape mass. His figure drawing surpassed that of previous expedition artists.The Discovery carried William Bayly as the astronomer for the Board of Longitude. David Nelson joined the crew as a botanical collector. He was a gardener from Kew Gardens. Joseph Banks sent Nelson to gather plants. William Anderson and James King performed scientific observations alongside Bayly and Nelson. William Ellis contributed to the mission by painting birds. These men formed the scientific staff for the exploration.

Both ships were supplied with the maximum amount of necessities that space allowed, and every effort was made to secure the best quality supplies available. Items found useful in previous expeditions for maintaining sailor health were provided in abundance. The ships moved to Long Reach at the end of May. There, they received artillery, powder, shot, and other ordnance supplies. In response to royal instructions, the expedition included livestock for the benefit of Pacific islanders. Onboard were a bull, two cows with calves, sheep, and their feed. More animals would be added at the Cape of Good Hope. The ships also carried various European garden seeds intended to enhance local agriculture on the islands they visited.

The Admiralty provided additional items aimed at improving local conditions in the Pacific. Both ships carried iron tools and trinkets to facilitate trade and build relationships with people encountered during the journey. Supplies for the crew included extra clothing suitable for cold climates, as well as any other items thought necessary for health and comfort. The naval department took further steps to ensure the voyage would have scientific value. Astronomical and navigational instruments were supplied by the Board of Longitude, with Cook and Second Lieutenant King responsible for observations to advance navigation and astronomy. The Resolution carried a time-keeper, a copy of Mr. Harrison’s watch made by Mr. Kendall, which had performed well on a previous voyage. The Discovery received a similar time-keeper and instruments, managed by William Bailey, who had previously shown competence in such work.

Scientific staff included Mr. Anderson, the surgeon, who brought expertise in both medicine and natural history. His previous experience in the region made him a valuable contributor to the documentation of the expedition. Several junior officers were assigned to assist with chart-making, drawing coastal views, and planning harbours, activities considered essential for the usefulness of the voyage to future navigators. To provide detailed visual records, Mr. Webber was chosen as the expedition artist. His drawings were intended to supplement written descriptions and offer a visual account of the places and events encountered.

Once preparations were complete, Cook received orders to proceed to Plymouth and to take the Discovery under his command. Captain Clerke was instructed to join the Resolution at Plymouth, ready for the journey ahead.

== Voyage ==
=== From England to New Zealand ===
Cook left the Nore on 25 June and sailed to Plymouth. There, marines came on board, and the Discovery’s crew joined as well. Upon arrival, Cook received his formal orders and the crew was paid early so they could purchase items needed for the journey. On 8 July, Cook ordered Clerke to proceed to Plymouth as soon as he reported for duty. At this time, Clerke was unable to comply because he was imprisoned due to debts incurred by his brother, for which Clerke had stood as guarantor. Despite intervention by naval and political figures, Clerke was not released until the end of July, after which he quickly travelled to Plymouth.

Cook decided to stop at Tenerife instead of Madeira to obtain better feed for the livestock. The water and fresh provisions at Tenerife were acceptable, but the wine was not satisfactory. While there, Cook interacted with French and Spanish naval officers involved in scientific work and navigation. After three days, Cook departed Tenerife on 4 August and passed east of the Cape Verde islands, narrowly avoiding danger near Boa Vista due to a navigation error. The passage took a route south of the equator, then west toward Brazil, and finally east to the Cape, arriving twelve days sooner than on his previous voyage. The journey was mostly uneventful, with time spent addressing leaks and making routine navigational observations.

When crossing the equator, the crew performed the traditional ducking ceremony, which most sailors preferred over paying a bottle of rum. Cook did not record this event in his journal, but Bligh did. Cook reached the Cape of Good Hope on 17 October and anchored in Table Bay the following day. In Cape Town, Cook found a welcoming environment among officials and merchants. He attended a formal dinner with the governor, complete with gun salutes. The crew enjoyed time on shore, and some officers took excursions to study local plants and wildlife. One crew member, caught for coining, was punished and sent back to England. A storm damaged tents and threatened equipment, but the ship was not harmed. On 10 November, the Discovery arrived, having experienced some storms and being blown off course near the port for a week. Clerke’s crew remained healthy through careful management. His ship arrived in good condition and was drier than the Resolution.

The two ships sailed in company on 1 December and on 13 December located and named the Prince Edward Islands. Twelve days later, Cook found the Kerguelen Islands, which he had failed to find on his second voyage. Driven by strong westerly winds, they reached Van Diemen's Land (current island of Tasmania) on 26 January 1777, where they took on water and wood and became cursorily acquainted with the aborigines living there. The ships reached Queen Charlotte Sound, New Zealand, on 12 February. The area provided ample resources, including fresh water, vegetables from past plantings, grass, and fish. The crew remained free from scurvy, but Cook maintained strict routines, including brewing spruce beer as a grog substitute. He took additional security measures compared to earlier visits, keeping armed guards with shore parties and never sending boats unprotected. These precautions followed previous violent incidents such as the Grass Cove attack and the loss of Marion’s men in 1772.

Local people were initially wary, even those familiar with Cook. He soon gained their trust, and families camped nearby. Cook observed their efficiency in setting up temporary shelters. While some officers noted greed and suspicion among the New Zealanders, Cook focused more on individuals, sometimes recording names and details. He noticed a lack of gratitude in some exchanges, especially when valuable items like hatchets were given away. Cook did not retaliate for the Grass Cove incident, despite expectations among both his men and the local people. The New Zealanders expected utu, or revenge, but Cook refused to act, believing it would serve no purpose. He explained his position to all who urged retribution, stating he would remain a friend unless provoked again. The man identified as a leader in the attack even visited Cook’s ship without hesitation.

During the stay, the men gathered large quantities of fish and local greens. The officers made extensive scientific and navigational observations. Anderson, the surgeon, studied the natural environment and the people, while Samwell recorded native songs and Webber produced drawings. Omai, acting as interpreter, arranged to take a young New Zealander, Tiarooa, with him, along with a younger companion, Coaa. Cook felt uneasy about this, but allowed it when he saw the community’s lack of concern. Before departure, two local chiefs requested animals. Cook agreed to give them goats and pigs, cautioning them to keep the animals alive. He decided not to leave larger livestock due to concerns about their safety.

=== Cook Islands ===
When Cook left Ship Cove for Tahiti, he was already behind schedule. The original plan had been unrealistic, and delays meant he would miss the optimal season for exploring the North Pacific. This required extending the journey by another year and further strained supplies. After leaving New Zealand at the end of February, relations on the Resolution quickly deteriorated. Tensions rose after Cook punished the entire crew for theft by cutting meat rations, leading to a standoff when the crew refused to eat. This event marked the beginning of a growing rift between Cook and his men. The voyage to the Society Islands was slow, plagued by unfavorable winds. Both ships soon faced shortages of water and animal fodder, forcing Cook to slaughter sheep to ease the situation. He realised that resupplying was urgent.

At the end of March, they sighted Mangaia, which promised fresh resources but was inaccessible due to reefs and an unwelcoming local population. Soon after, they reached Atiu, where interactions again failed to secure needed provisions. A deserted island provided scurvy grass and some fodder but little else. With supplies diminishing and the winds against him, Cook decided to sail to Tonga, where he knew resources were available. As he left the Cook Islands, Cook passed by fertile and resource-rich islands, but immediate needs forced him to prioritise Tonga.

=== Tonga ===
By the end of April 1777, the ships reached the Friendly Islands (Tonga), where they stayed for eleven weeks. The crew rested and replenished stores, but observers noted changes in Cook’s behaviour. He enforced strict trade rules and punished thefts severely, even when chiefs were involved.

Floggings became more frequent and harsher, with some punishments reaching sixty lashes. Officers and crew noted their discomfort with the captain’s increasing severity. Cook’s actions included cutting off ears, firing at offenders, and other harsh measures. Clerke and others questioned the long stay, as all necessary supplies had been secured and there was time to explore nearby islands, but Cook showed little interest in further exploration. During this period, Cook appeared more focused on controlling theft and order than on navigation or discovery. His officers recorded their concerns privately, while Cook’s journal omitted any mention of his anger or the growing discontent. Unknown to him, some local chiefs had even plotted against the expedition, a fact only revealed years later. By July, after nearly three months, the ships finally left Tonga for Tahiti. Cook’s writing and conduct suggested a weary and detached leader, no longer displaying the restraint and curiosity that had marked his earlier voyages.

=== Tahiti ===
The journey from Tonga to Tahiti lasted four weeks, hindered by a severe squall that damaged the Discovery but caused minimal delay. In early August, he discovered Tubuai, an island in the Austral group. After encountering canoes, he chose not to land and instead continued to Tahiti, reaching it on the 12th. Omai did well to survive the voyage. His return created a difficult social situation. Despite being initially welcomed by his sister, Omai remained oblivious to his countrymen's greater interest in his treasures than in him. Captain Cook, aware of the changes since his last visit, noted the rising tensions and a shift in power dynamics, including exaggerated tales of Spanish gifts to the islanders. He discovered that the reality was far less impressive, yet felt reassured that his own livestock would be embraced. Reinforcing British claims, Cook marked a cross referencing the Spanish presence and emphasised that the Tahitians showed little interest in the Spaniards or their religious views, remaining amicable towards the British. Cook's paternal attitude towards Omai contrasted with the reality of their relationship as he prepared for their homecoming amid the complexities of colonial interactions.

In a significant moment of his expedition, the captain called his crew together to discuss their missed opportunity to explore the Northwest Passage, addressing the implications for their schedule and supplies of alcohol. Surprisingly, the men opted to conserve their grog for future needs rather than indulge immediately, an unusual decision reflective of their captain's increasingly erratic leadership. The captain then disposed of various animals he had brought aboard, leaving them on the island, proclaiming satisfaction in fulfilling the King's wishes despite the burdens of their transportation. Meanwhile, Omai, the captain’s companion, faced a decline in his status as he squandered his possessions and associated with the local unsavory characters. Despite the captain's hopes for Omai's successful integration into island society, Omai's behaviour led to ridicule rather than respect, culminating in a series of embarrassing incidents, including his failed attempts to engage with local leaders and misguided displays of opulence. Cook set sail to explore the island of Moorea, leaving behind Omai for his protection. Moorea, a stunning volcanic island, displayed beautiful landscapes.

Cook anchored close to the shore but faced challenges as rats from his ships did not take to their new home, and the local Mooreans were cautious due to previous skirmishes with Tahitians. After a stolen goat incident escalated tensions, Cook intervened, attempting to maintain peace while pursuing the thief. In a moment of grave indecision, he disregarded the advice of the Moorean elders to violently confront the locals. Instead, he led an armed group on a destructive rampage across the island, burning homes, canoes, and local crops, terrorising the inhabitants. He sent a threatening message to the king demanding the return of a goat, warning of further destruction. As the chaos ensued, Omai and his men joined in the violence, indulging in the devastation until they returned to find the goat grazing peacefully on the shore.

Thus the troublesome, and rather unfortunate affair ended, which could not be more regreted on the part of the Natives that it was on mine. Regretful he might have been, but some of the officers were decidedly uncomfortable. They noted something new in this ruthless, vengeful Cook, something out of control and terrifying; but even those who disapproved dared not publicly question their captain’s actions for fear that the rage would be turned on them. Cook and his crew left for Huahine, where Tahitian lovers recounted the horrific events of recent days. Reflecting on these tales, Cook hoped they would deter theft among the local inhabitants. As October approached, preparations were underway to find a home for Omai, who wished to reclaim his father's land in Raiatea. However, Cook brokered a deal with Huahine chiefs for land to build Omai a residence instead. During construction, the theft of a sextant incited Cook's wrath; after threatening dire consequences, the thief was captured, leading to severe punishment while Omai remained involved in the intrigue. Cook's increasing unpredictability was evident as he sought to maintain peace in escalating tensions.

By the end of October, Omai’s house and gardens had been repaired and he spent his days holding court to the small group of retainers that had joined him. Cook looked at the house and the childlike man and knew that, whatever the future held for the young Tahitian, his job at least was done. As a farewell gift, he left Omai the horse and mare, a goat, a boar and sows and, reluctantly, some powder for his firearms. He had no great hopes for his continued success, although he wished him well. During the time spent together, Omai displayed a commendable nature and docile disposition, with few reasons for the narrator to find fault in his behaviour. He retained a heartfelt gratitude for the kindness shown to him in England and would not forget those who befriended him.

The parting moment was emotional for all, particularly for Omai, who was leaving with mementos such as scars from cannon fire, gifts from King Tosh, and his 'British' house. While sailing away, Omai clung to his companions, adorned in his finery, trying to hold back tears. Ultimately, he could no longer contain his emotions, embracing Captain Cook and weeping, which led to James King guiding him to the boat. The departure scene was poignant, with locals and the Māori boys crying as they watched the ships leave. Both ships now sailed in silence, contrasting the lively sounds that had accompanied their journey, as Cook unexpectedly ordered a stop at Raiatea, leaving his officers perplexed despite their adequate supplies for the next leg of their journey.

Cook reached Raiatea on 3 November and anchored near Haamanino harbour. The ships were greeted by chief Orio and his family, along with many islanders bringing food and gifts. Cook repeated measures to control rats and set up shore observatories for scientific work. Omai sent word from Huahine requesting goats and axes, which Cook supplied. During the stay, two periods of desertion disrupted the routine. The first occurred when John Harrison, a marine, left his post and hid with locals. Cook tracked him down, retrieved him, and applied only moderate punishment after hearing his reasons. Cook then addressed the crew, warning that any future deserters would be recovered and that local chiefs would be held responsible. Soon after, two more men, Mouat and Shaw, ran away from Discovery.

The officers organised searches, and local chiefs were enlisted to recover them. The deserters were eventually found on Tupai and returned. Shaw was flogged, Mouat was punished and imprisoned, and the episode ended with hostages being released. Throughout the month, the ships were resupplied and repairs completed. The crew remained healthy, except for cases of disease unrelated to their contact with the islanders. Both Anderson and Clerke were ill, but continued their duties. Cook planned a brief call at Borabora to obtain a lost anchor from chief Puni. After a short negotiation, Cook secured a piece of the anchor, gave gifts, and left a ewe on the island before departing. The visit to Borabora was brief, and the ships soon sailed north, leaving the islands behind.

=== Christmas Island ===
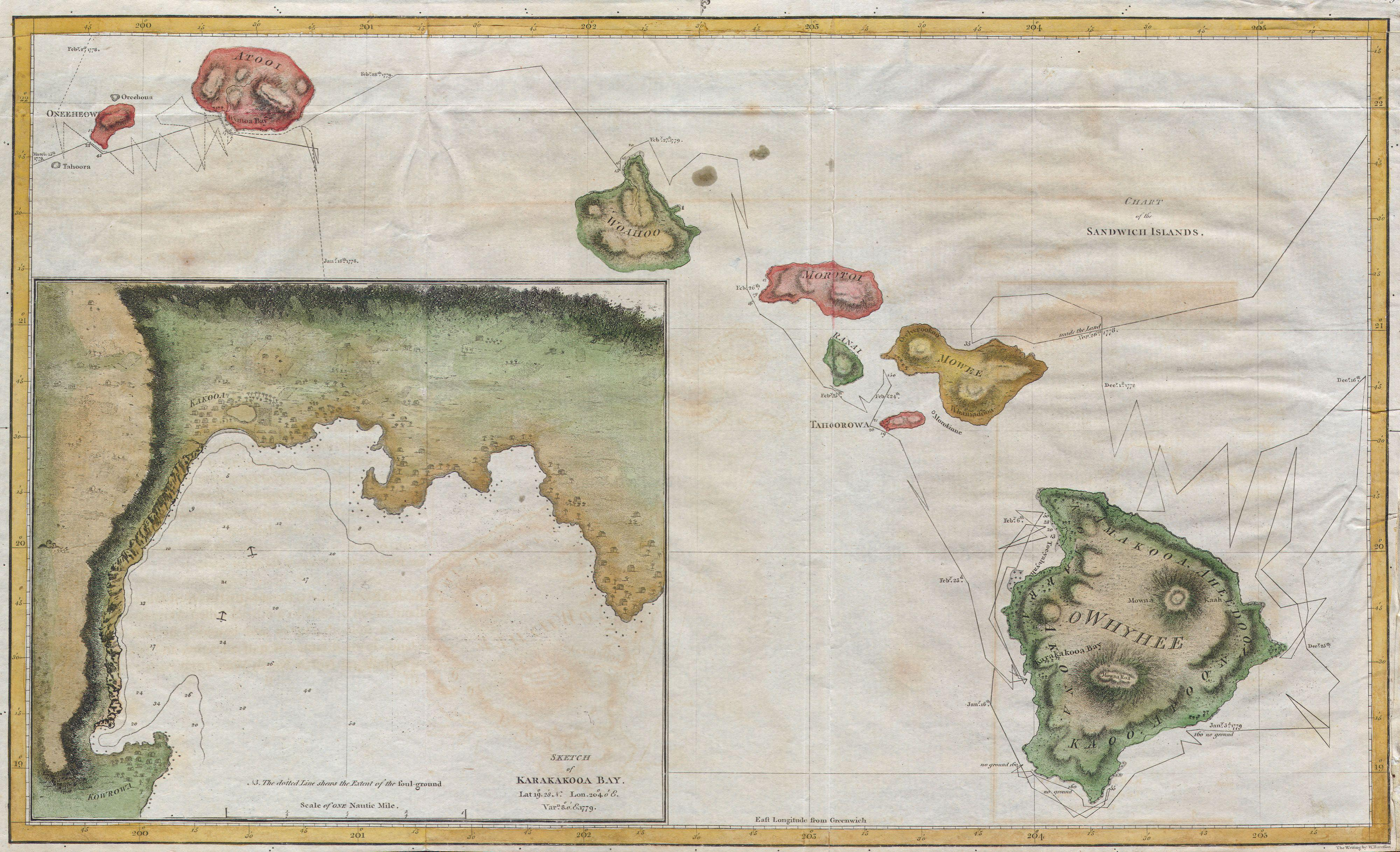
Map of the Hawaiian Islands made by one of Cook's officers, probably William Bligh.

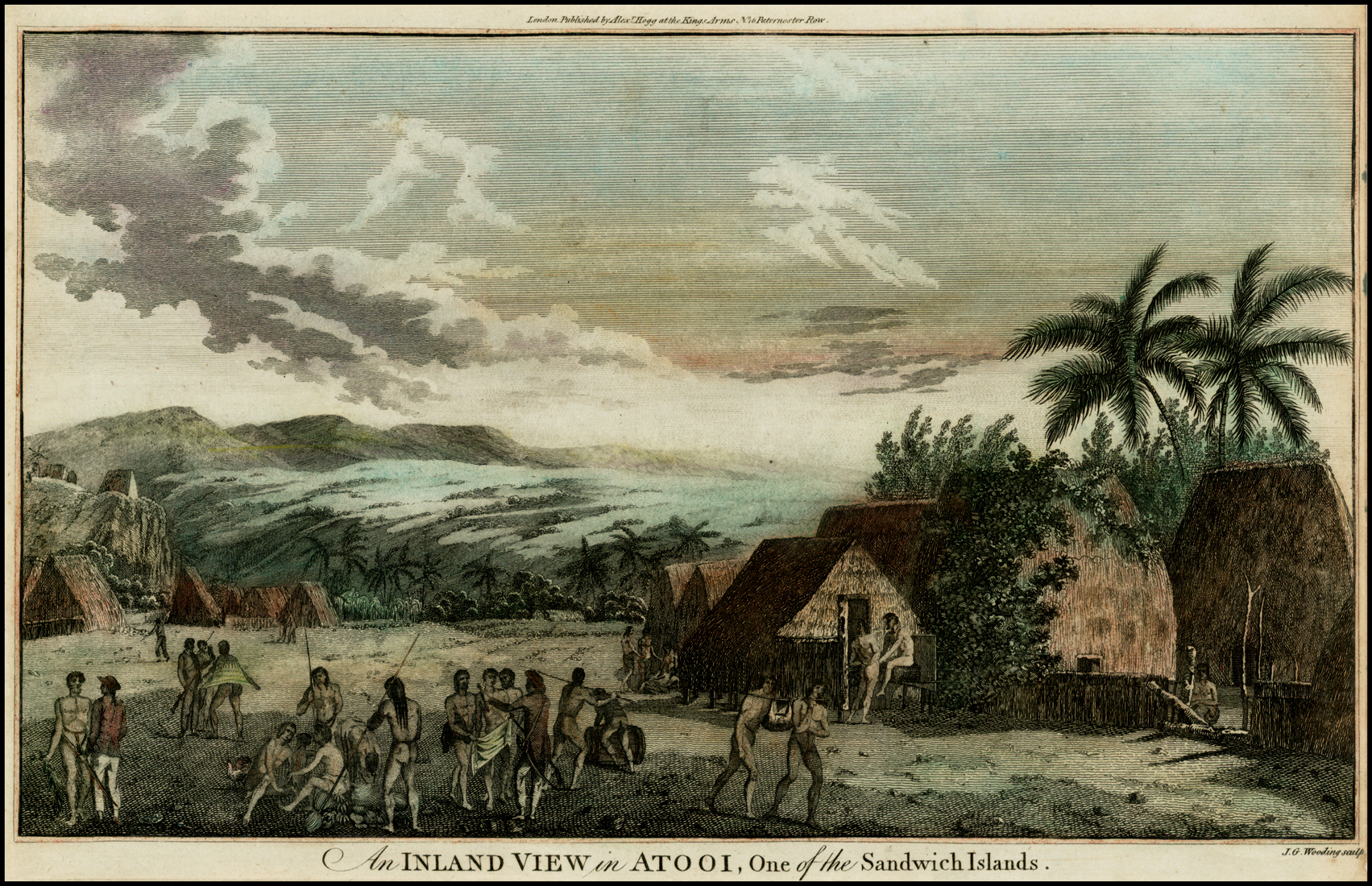
A hand-coloured lithograph depicting a village visited by Captain James Cook near Waimea, Kauai, on his third voyage. Based on a 1778 etching by John Webber which was published by William Hodges, it is one of the few views of Hawaii made during Cook's third voyage (1776–1779).

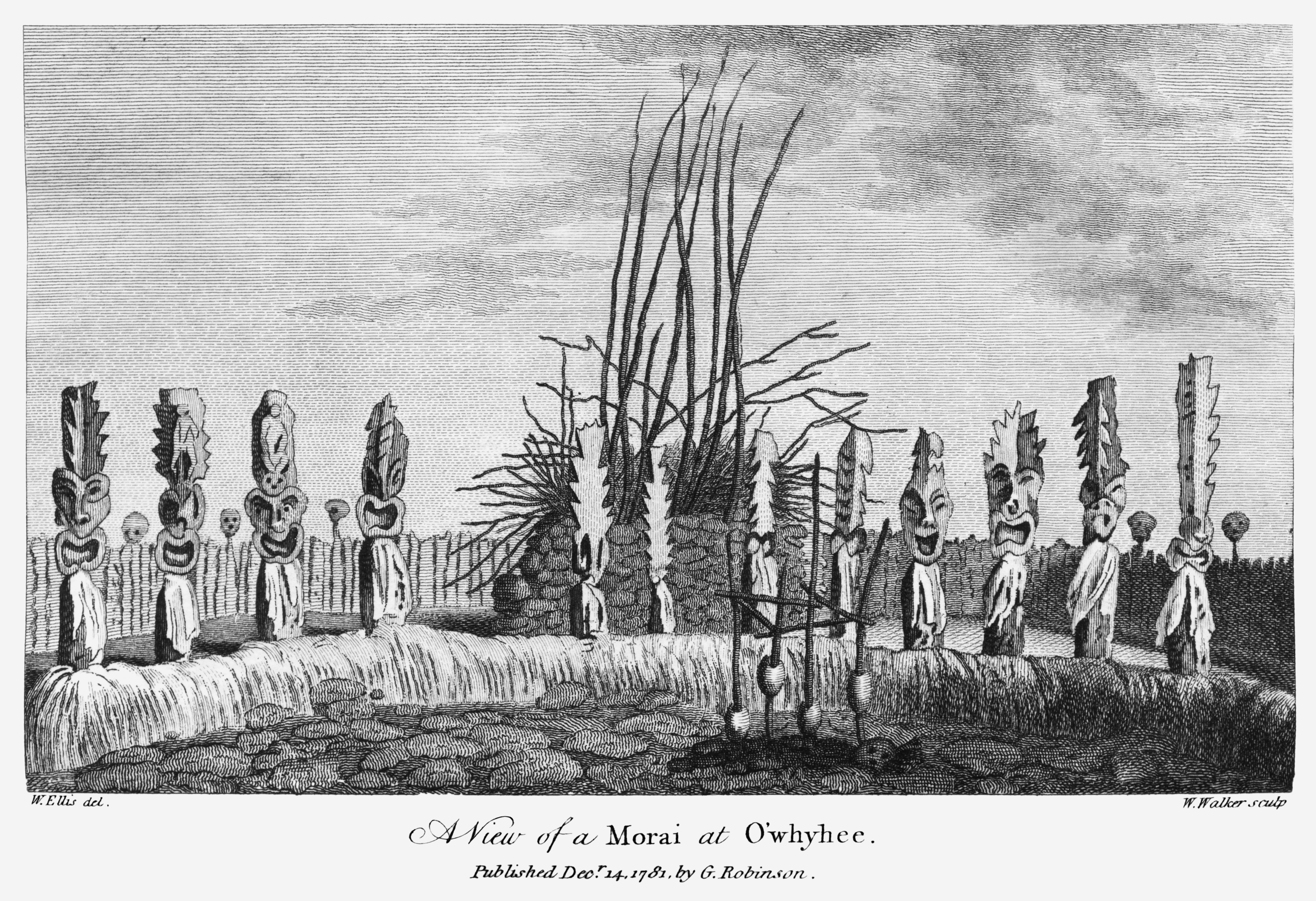
Kealakekua Bay heiau (temple); illustration by William Ellis.

Cook’s orders required him to reach the American coast near 65° north by June. Starting from 17° south, he had six months to cover a large distance, including a complex coastal route along North America from 45° north. Sailing directly east was not practical because of steady easterly and north-easterly winds. Instead, Cook aimed north, hoping to catch the westerlies that aided Spanish treasure ships returning from the Philippines. For two weeks, he made good progress, skirting east of the Line Islands and almost passing close enough to see Starbuck Island. On the night of 22–23 December 1777, the ships crossed the equator at 156°45’ West. By dawn on the 24th, they sighted land to the northeast. This proved to be Christmas Island, a vast atoll with an opening in the reef that allowed entry to a shallow lagoon.

The ships anchored on the leeward side. Cook and his men spent several days fishing and capturing turtles. He also set up an observatory on shore to observe a solar eclipse on 30 December. Christmas was celebrated while at anchor. By the time they departed on 2 January 1778, they had taken on 300 turtles, each averaging ninety-five pounds. Cook left a sealed bottle on the island, claiming it for Britain. Water was still in short supply after leaving Christmas Island. Within days, Clerke began rationing his crew to two quarts per day.

=== Hawaii ===
The ships continued north with mostly favourable winds, and on 18 January, land was sighted. This was not North America, but one of the islands in the Hawaiian group. The ships approached the eastern coast of Kauai on the afternoon of 19 January. Soon, canoes came out from shore and the crew realised the islanders spoke a language similar to Tahitian.

Local people were surprised by the arrival of the ships and the goods they carried. When some Hawaiians were persuaded to come aboard, their amazement at the ships and European items was clear. Cook enforced strict discipline to limit contact between his crew and local women, aiming to prevent the spread of venereal disease. He sent Williamson and three armed boats to scout for water and anchorage. During this mission, a local man was shot and killed during a confused encounter, but this was not immediately reported to Cook. The ships anchored in Waimea Bay, where Cook and his men were received with marked respect. The islanders greeted him by prostrating themselves, a gesture usually reserved for their highest chiefs. The next day, as the crew collected water and traded for food, Cook and several officers visited an important religious site, the heiau. The group received the same respectful treatment throughout their walk. Trading was brisk and honest, with nails and tools in high demand.

Bad weather soon forced Cook to move the ships farther offshore. Strong currents and shifting winds made it difficult to hold their position or return to Waimea Bay. After several days of trying to recover the anchorage, Cook and Clerke found themselves west of Kauai, near Niihau. Cook decided to try landing at Niihau for water. Gore went ashore but found no fresh water, only yams and salt. Surf made loading supplies difficult, and some goods were lost. Cook attempted to land but, concerned about being unable to return in worsening weather, went back to the ship. Gore and his party ended up stranded on Niihau for two nights due to heavy rain and high surf. Eventually, a safe anchorage was found at the southeast point, and Cook retrieved his men.

He gifted livestock and seeds to a local authority figure. Again, Cook was greeted with ceremony and people prostrated themselves as he walked inland. The soil was poor, but the islanders prized fragrant plants, and a stream provided some water. Before Cook could return to shore, a swell loosened the ship’s anchor and forced him to put to sea. By 2 February 1778, with little water secured and trading opportunities lost, Cook and Clerke left the Hawaiian group, which Cook named the Sandwich Islands. The visit, while peaceful and full of cultural exchange, left Cook with limited practical gain for the onward voyage. He now turned north again, resuming his journey toward North America.

=== Search for the Northwest passage ===
From Hawaii, Cook went northeast on 2 February to explore the west coast of North America north of the Spanish settlements in Alta California. The decision to sail revealed a significant oversight in Cook's typically meticulous organisation, as the crew failed to complete their watering while in the islands, despite abundant water sources. Nevertheless, they successfully replenished their supplies with fruits and vegetables, fully expecting to reach New Albion soon. As they sailed, their latitude approached the prescribed 45° of Cook's instructions, leading to the first signs of land, including seals and birds. On 7 March 1778, Cook sighted the American coast, specifically present-day Oregon, naming the promontory Cape Foulweather due to the severe weather conditions.

As he continued northward, he encountered relentless storms, with a significant tempest beginning on 11 March when winds shifted dramatically, creating enormous seas and a harsh mix of sleet and snow. Cook had no option but to steer southward under heavy sail to avoid the treacherous coastline, resulting in a loss of northward progress of over two degrees of latitude by the morning of 13 March. His frustrations grew as he struggled to move north, unable to anchor safely amid the constant gales from various directions, including a challenging sequence of storms that hindered his voyage until the end of the month. Cook passed the Juan de Fuca Strait at night, dismissing its existence due to not observing it firsthand. Eventually, he reached the western coast of what is now Vancouver Island, noting land again at Nootka Sound on 29 March. There, he found a suitable inlet for ship repairs and encountered local inhabitants eager to trade, who greeted the expedition with song, adorned in animal skins and painted. This interaction marked a significant moment of cultural exchange during his voyage.

Cook's strict hygiene protocol influenced his crew's attitudes towards local women, with many of them finding the conditions unappealing. Despite encouraging cleanliness, Cook softened his approach to thievery, opting to accept losses rather than impose harsh punishments, a change possibly influenced by his reflections on past violence. Clerke, whose health was declining, also chose not to discipline thieves during brief visits, prioritising smoother relations over minor thefts. Near the end of their time in Nootka Sound, Cook and his midshipmen engaged in a rowing exploration of the shoreline, culminating on 26 April when they departed with the farewell songs of the Nootka Indians. However, their exit was marked by the onset of a severe five-day hurricane, causing the ship Resolution to spring a leak, which Cook found alarming though manageable. More concerning was the crew's loss of sight of land, jeopardising their objective of finding the Northwest Passage.

Following the subsiding hurricane, Captain Cook aimed to disprove the existence of the 'pretended strait of Admiral de Fonte' as he navigated back to the coast. On 1 May, he observed an uninviting shoreline too far north and opted against exploration, realising there was no Northwest Passage—only an expanse of islands and rocky channels. For the next ten days, Cook's ships moved slowly along the coast while the crew searched for any passage that could lead to the £20,000 reward. He struggled to reconcile his observations with the Müller map and Bering's accounts amidst the chaos of islands and points extending northward. Fixated on the coast, he became obsessed with the discovery.

As they neared the discovery zone, Cook defied his Admiralty orders, which instructed him to avoid exploring any inlets until reaching 65°N, and instead diverted into the Gulf of Alaska at 61°N to investigate a promising bay penetrating inland. King noted their suspenseful anticipation of finding an opening to separate the continent. Contrary to their hopes for open water, they encountered indigenous people described by Clerke as "fine jolly full faced fellows," marked with tattoos and piercings, who approached amicably despite their unfamiliarity with firearms and their thieving behaviour. On 20 May, as another storm approached, Captain Cook decided to repair the leaky ship while assessing whether the current location was an inlet or the sought-after Passage. Bligh dismissed the potential of further exploration, while Gore remained hopeful. Ultimately, Cook opted to leave the inlet, doubting the existence of a Passage, which he later named Prince William Sound.

With the June deadline approaching, they were forced south instead of north, leading Cook and King to analyse maps for possible routes. As Cook's mental state fluctuated between hope and despair over whether to continue searching or to sail on, the officers' differing opinions created tension. Gore's optimism swayed Cook to reconsider, culminating in his decision on 25 May to move the ships into the channel for further exploration, despite his lingering doubts. Cook's diminishing self-confidence delayed the expedition by sixteen days, resulting in futile searches and adverse weather conditions. Gore, displaying determination, named a surveyed shore 'Nancy’s Foreland' after a personal acquaintance, but even he couldn't ignore the reality that they were in Cook Inlet, Alaska, where no passage existed, contrary to Cook's beliefs. Despite impatience to progress, Cook forwent the chance to validate the non-existence of a river that he believed led inland, thus missing the opportunity to confirm the inlet's dead-end status.

His primary challenge was navigating a coastline that misdirected him southwest rather than north towards the Arctic, diverging from his orders. The weather severely impaired visibility, and Cook struggled with navigation amid treacherous shoals and shifting winds. As they sailed blindly, the coastline remained hazardous, prompting them to avoid it—a warning that persists today. Yet, Cook and Clerke navigated safely, even pausing to fish under the shadow of a volcano. Unbeknownst to them, they were at the end of the Alaskan Gulf, on the brink of the Aleutian Islands which extend towards Asia. Cook and Clerke navigated a dangerous coastline filled with reefs. His navigational charts were of little assistance, and the challenging weather compounded his anxiety, resulting in a loss of direction.

This indecision led to a critical error where he overlooked a significant ten-mile-wide passage off Unimak Island that would have granted access to the Bering Sea. The following day, however, Cook shifted from hesitation to reckless bravado, choosing to sail at full speed despite dangerously poor visibility that limited sight to the ship's length. His crew, including Bligh and other officers, reacted with dismay, yet Cook, seemingly driven by a self-destructive impulse, sailed into the fog causing a near grounding. In July, the crew navigated the foggy waters of the Alaskan Peninsula, making slow progress north-east along the coast. On the sixteenth, Williamson landed to evaluate the territory, claiming the barren land as Cape Newenham. The expedition faced challenges as the land misled them southward while they aimed north.

Eventually, on 29 July, a brief break in the fog allowed them to obtain their position at 59°55'N, still over five degrees away from their target latitude. This arduous navigation contributed to Cook's deteriorating mood. The fleeting appearance of St Matthew's Island added to the ethereal yet frustrating experience, culminating in the death of esteemed surgeon William Anderson on 3 August, intensifying Cook's sense of despair. On 9 August, the fog lifted, revealing the target location of 65°N, where the explorers encountered the prominent Cape Prince of Wales and open water. Cook was uncertain if he had reached Siberia or Stählin’s island of ‘Alaschka’. He anchored in Lawrence Bay on the Chukotskiy Peninsula to converse and trade with the Chukchi people, his mood uplifted by improved weather and the site of open water. Two days later, they successfully crossed the Bering Strait into the Arctic Ocean.

Their aspirations of finding a Passage, returning home, motivated them through the area's harsh conditions. King calculated their distance to Baffin Bay, and optimism remained as scientists claimed the sea would not freeze. However, by 17 August at 70° North, the sun revealed an alarming sight: ice filled the horizon, rising dramatically from the sea, ultimately dashing their hopes of finding a navigable route home. The silence of the empty sea was disrupted by the violent sounds of ice clashing and the calls of walruses which were hunted by men eager for fresh meat to break their monotonous diet. However, the walrus meat turned out to be unpalatable, leading to dissatisfaction among the crew. Captain Cook, angered by the dissent, insisted on continuing to serve walrus meat, while the sailors, bound by tradition, found it revolting and considered a hunger strike.

The standoff lasted for days while the hungry crew approached exhaustion. This situation forced Cook to change his position. The officers felt concern regarding the shift in their commander. Cook had previously led through different methods, such as his previous efforts regarding sauerkraut. He now used punishment instead of his usual tactics. This change created tension with his men. Over the following days, the men's worries intensified as it became evident, except to Cook, that their northern expedition was futile due to rapidly advancing ice. Rather than concede defeat, Cook, driven by a deep aversion to failure, relentlessly sought a way through the ice, first heading north and then west.

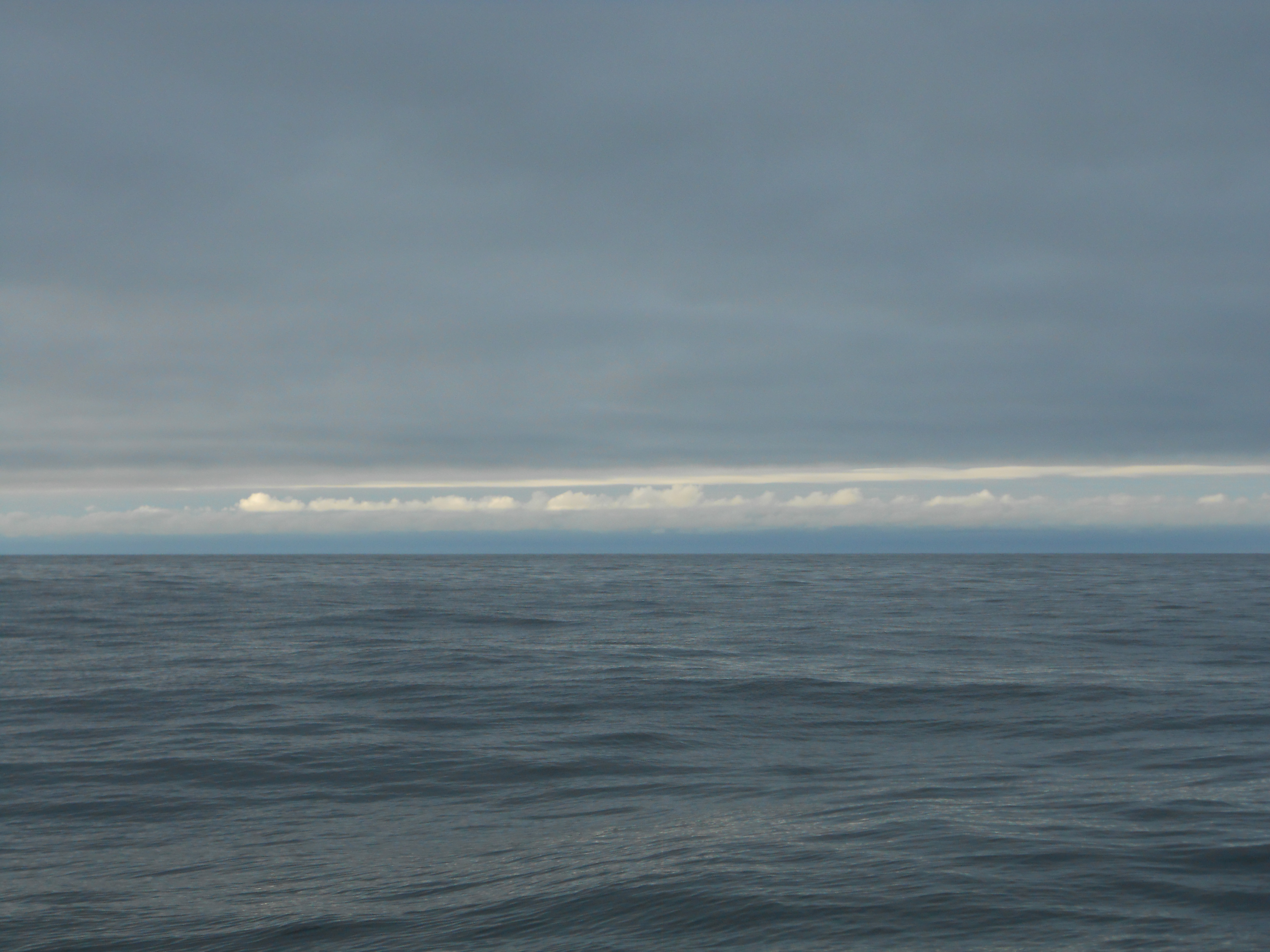
At this location off Wainwright, Alaska, Cook decided that his path north was completely blocked by ice and turned south again

He contemplated shifting his route to the Northeast, aiming over Siberia back to Britain, determined to secure a harbour and overcome the icy barrier. Cook's fixation bordered on madness as he battled the wind and ice, ultimately feeling vanquished and expressing his disdain for misguided theories of 'Closet studying Philosophers'. Confronted by an insurmountable foe formed at sea rather than by rivers, Cook realised his expedition had yielded only three weeks in the Arctic Ocean and a mere eight days near the American continent after extensive preparation and two years of sailing. He finally called his officers to inform them of their retreat south to regroup and prepare for another attempt at discovering the Northwest Passage the following year.

On 27 October 1778, Cook marked his fiftieth birthday quietly at sea near Unalaska. He had corrected inaccuracies in Russian maps, replenished supplies, and interacted with local inhabitants and Russian officials. Cook began to devise a plan to explore the Sandwich Islands, believing this would be a better use of winter than staying in Kamchatka. He aimed to create accurate charts of these islands to benefit navigation. Before departing Unalaska, he had given the Russians a letter for the Admiralty in London, updating them on his progress, challenges with ice, and plans to retreat to Hawaii for the winter while expressing doubts about finding a passage in the distant open sea.

=== Return to Hawaii and Death of Captain Cook ===
On 26 November, Cook’s ships sighted Maui under clear skies. They had missed Oahu and Kauai after an eastern deviation. The island impressed the crew with steep cliffs, strong surf, and the extinct volcano Haleakala partly hidden by clouds. Polynesian canoes soon approached, and a crew member rescued a cat that had fallen overboard, an event Clerke took as a good omen. Locals at first offered small amounts of food, but when Cook stated his needs, they brought larger supplies, including breadfruit and pigs. Local women joined the trading, while men examined the nails and tools provided by the crew. The king of Maui visited Cook’s ship, bringing pigs and wearing a feathered cap and cloak, signalling a warm welcome despite his frail condition.

The next day, Cook observed Hawaii island for the first time, noting its size and a dramatic landscape of cliffs, waterfalls, and snow-capped peaks. Thousands of natives gathered, waving white cloths as the ships approached. Tensions rose among the crew, and Cook relaxed rules to allow women on board, warning only against contact with sick sailors. He substituted the sailors’ daily grog with a sweet drink from sugar cane to conserve supplies, but the crew disliked it and refused to drink, worsening their discontent. The situation nearly led to mutiny during bad weather in December. Intervention by officers John Gore and James King seemed to influence Cook’s change of approach. The sugar beer was abandoned, grog and women were allowed again, and morale improved. Trading resumed near Cape Kumukahi on 21 December, with canoes bringing fruit, vegetables, and pigs. Sailors traded knives and axes, and lively exchanges took place until sunset. The local people swam to the ships when canoes were full, and the crew compared the native women favourably to those on other islands.

Two days before Christmas, a native unintentionally left aboard blended in with the crew but became frightened during Christmas celebrations, adding to the sailors’ sense of Polynesian mystery. After successful trade and enjoyment, the crew felt their earlier hardships had faded, though some sensed unease linked to the commander and a lingering sense of foreboding. Navigating Cape Kumukahi was hazardous due to changing winds, squalls, and rain. The ships came perilously close to shore at night, with damaged sails and rough seas. After repairs, Cook ordered another attempt, but Bligh was forced to retreat due to worsening conditions. Eventually, the Resolution rounded the cape but became separated from the Discovery for the first time, causing concern. On New Year’s Day, the Resolution sailed along Hawaii’s barren southeastern coast, landing proved difficult, and only brackish water was found. Trade was limited, and the men became dispirited after weeks at sea, short on water and fresh food, with a deteriorating ship and no news of the Discovery.

Meanwhile, the Discovery had suffered even worse rigging damage and water shortages, but Clerke managed to maintain higher spirits among his crew. After days of searching, the two ships were reunited on 6 January. Both captains realised the need to find a safe anchorage and repair their vessels before returning to the Arctic. Their confidence in the Sandwich Islands as a favourable base had faded because of unreliable winds and currents. The islands’ coasts showed little promise for landing or supplies, with only sporadic trade and little vegetation. On 10 January, the crew’s spirits lifted briefly when women from passing canoes performed a dance on board. The following days saw little improvement, with shifting winds and barren shores, until 15 January, when more canoes arrived with abundant provisions. Bligh was sent to scout a bay and found good anchorage with friendly locals. On 17 January, Cook brought both ships into Kealakekua Bay, ending their long search for a suitable haven.

Unbeknown to Cook, his arrival coincided with the Makahiki, a Hawaiian harvest festival of worship for the Polynesian god Lono. Coincidentally, the form of Cook's ship, HMS Resolution—specifically the mast formation, sails, and rigging—resembled certain significant artefacts that formed part of the season of worship. Similarly, Cook's clockwise route around the island of Hawaii before making landfall resembled the processions that took place in a clockwise direction around the island during the Lono festivals. (Note: It has been argued that such coincidences were the reasons for Cook's (and to a limited extent, his crew's) initial deification by some Hawaiians who treated Cook as an incarnation of Lono. Though this view was first suggested by members of Cook's expedition, the idea that any Hawaiians understood Cook to be Lono, and the evidence presented in support of it has been challenged.)

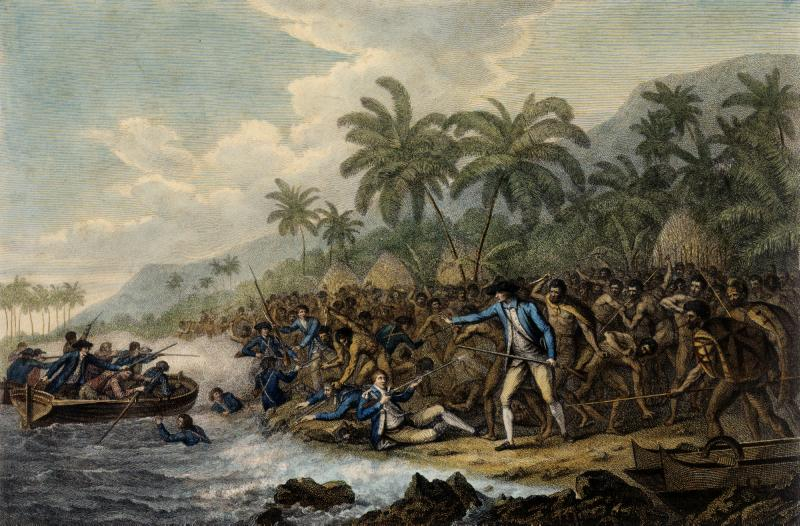
The Death of Captain Cook painted by John Webber

After a month's stay, Cook got under sail to resume his exploration of the Northern Pacific. After the Resolution’s foremast broke on 8 February, the ships returned to Kealakekua Bay on 11 February for repairs. When they arrived, the atmosphere had changed. The bay, once bustling, was now quiet and nearly empty. Trade persisted but locals demanded iron daggers and other metal objects, making exchanges difficult. The ship’s blacksmith worked constantly to forge these items from scrap metal. Repairs began quickly, with the old mast removed and sent ashore under Lieutenant King’s supervision. While work continued, thefts from the ships increased. A local man stole a set of tongs from the Discovery’s blacksmith, was caught, lashed forty times, and held until the tongs were returned. Clerke, anxious about the growing number of thefts, ordered all Hawaiians except priests off his ship.

On shore, a group of Hawaiians began harassing the sailors and their helpers, throwing stones and insults. The quartermaster requested marines. King and a marine intervened, demanding the chiefs control their people, which temporarily calmed the situation. However, Cook’s reaction to this news was severe; he suggested firing directly at any offenders. This was a striking change from his usual policy of restraint. Further trouble followed. While Clerke entertained a chief on the Discovery, another man stole tools and escaped in the chief’s canoe. Two seemen pursued but failed to catch the thief, who abandoned the tools on shore. Meanwhile, Cook and King, working on the mast repairs, saw the chase and heard shots. Misunderstanding the situation, Cook chased the thief with a marine, only for a crowd of locals to misdirect him. When a marine threatened to fire his musket, the locals laughed. In the confusion, the seemen seized a canoe belonging to a chief, which triggered a brawl. The chief was struck with an oar, prompting the crowd to retaliate with stones and looting. Ultimately, the chief himself stopped the fight and returned the boat and some stolen goods. Cook was furious with both his own officers and the Hawaiians and recognised that relations had deteriorated badly.

That night, the Discovery’s cutter—their only large boat—was stolen. Clerke informed Cook, and they agreed to blockade the bay and hold canoes for ransom. Clerke’s men went south and Lanyon’s to the north. Unbeknownst to his officers, Cook armed himself and prepared to go ashore, intending to take the Hawaiian king, Terreeoboo, as a hostage until the cutter was returned. (Note: The hostage-taking is not mentioned in Clerkes journal. It merely notes that Cook sent men to the bay's northwest and southeast after learning of the incident, seizing any canoes they came across until the cutter was brought back.) He landed at Kaawaloa with Lieutenant Phillips, nine marines, and two boats waiting near shore. Cook confronted the king, who seemed innocent and agreed to come aboard. As they approached the water, Terreeoboo’s wife and others begged him not to go, fearing for his safety. The king became confused and frightened, and a large crowd gathered, urging him to stay.

At the same time, across the bay, Rickman tried to enforce the blockade, firing on a canoe attempting to pass. Kalimu, a respected chief, was killed. His friends rushed to the ships in protest and carried the news to the crowd on shore, which exploded in anger. The crowd surged toward Cook’s party, now at the water’s edge. A warrior raised a dagger; Cook fired, but the shot had little effect. The crowd attacked with stones and daggers. Cook shot another man dead, and Phillips also fired, but the crowd kept coming. The king’s son jumped from the boat in terror. The marines fired into the crowd, but the situation was out of control. Cook signalled desperately for the boats to come in, but the crowd pressed in. Lieutenant Williamson, in the launch, misunderstood Cook’s signal and ordered the boats to withdraw, over the objections of his men. On shore, Cook was struck from behind with a club, then stabbed in the shoulder with an iron pahoa, a type of long poignard which had been made the day before by the Resolution's armorerto resemble their wooden pahoas. He fell into the water and was killed by repeated blows and stabs. Several marines were also killed, their bodies mutilated. The sailors in the boats witnessed the chaos but could do little to intervene.

On board the ships, the crews watched in shock and horror as Cook was killed. The bay fell silent after the violence. Both sides mourned their dead, with the British losing Cook and several marines, and the Hawaiians at least seventeen people, including chiefs. Many sailors blamed Williamson for not rescuing Cook and despised him for his perceived cowardice. Clerke, devastated by the events, took command and began gathering reports to make an official account. Clerke’s immediate priorities were to retrieve the dead, recover Cook’s remains, finish repairs, and leave. King and Burney tried to negotiate for the return of the bodies, but the marines’ remains had already been divided among villages as part of local rituals. Cook’s body had also been distributed to chiefs on the island. Some remains were returned, including a piece of Cook’s thigh. Later, Cook’s scalp, skull (without jaw), long bones, and hands were delivered in a feathered cloak. His jawbone, feet, shoes, and musket followed. These remains were placed in a coffin and buried at sea on 21 February in a solemn, silent ceremony attended by the entire crew.

During this period, tensions remained high. Some sailors, enraged and grieving, attacked villages, shooting and decapitating Hawaiians in retaliation. The mood on the ships was grim. There were also moments of surprising cultural gestures, such as two Hawaiian warriors swimming out to the ships to sing a lament for Cook and present their spears in atonement. After the burial and final repairs, the ships prepared to leave. Gore took command of the Discovery, King became First Lieutenant on the Resolution, and Williamson, unpopular with the crew, became Second Lieutenant by seniority. There was no sense of triumph; only a heavy sense of loss and futility. The officers and men felt the voyage’s spirit had been destroyed and that their mission was now reduced to duty alone.

The esteem in which he was nevertheless held by the Hawaiians caused their chiefs and elders to retain his body. Following the practice of the time, Cook's body underwent funerary rituals similar to those reserved for the chiefs and highest elders of the society. The body was disembowelled and baked to facilitate removal of the flesh, and the bones were carefully cleaned for preservation as religious icons in a fashion somewhat reminiscent of the treatment of European saints in the Middle Ages. Some of Cook's remains, disclosing some corroborating evidence to this effect, were eventually returned to the British for a formal burial at sea following an appeal by the crew.

== Homeward voyage ==
After finishing repairs and restocking water, the ships left Kealakekua Bay on 22 February and sailed north. They stopped at some islands for fresh supplies but faced rudeness from locals, likely due to news of their earlier conflict. At Kauai, King managed a tense situation during a watering mission when locals tried to extort high payments and stole his sword. King chose not to escalate the incident. Later, a misunderstanding among King’s men about honour delayed their departure, but they left together after seeing armed locals approach. A warning shot was fired, and a native was likely wounded. The next day, a large armed guard was sent with another party, but the area was deserted and under tabu. Chiefs explained the hostility was due to disputes over goats left earlier, not news of Cook’s death.

The ships departed the Sandwich Islands on 16 March, heading northwest. In late April, they approached Kamchatka after enduring poor weather and frequent ship separation. The Resolution was leaking badly, and the crew worked the pumps constantly. On 29 April, they entered Awatska Bay, to deliver letters and buy supplies. King went ashore over treacherous ice, fell through, but was rescued. Local armed men took them to the village, and after opening their letters, sent a message to the governor at Bolcheretsk. King and his party were given dry clothes and food, but told they must wait for a reply before further contact. The Discovery joined them on 1 May. On 4 May, envoys from Bolcheretsk arrived with a German letter from the governor, Major Behm. Ismyloff’s earlier letter had described the ships as small and possibly pirate vessels, which had led to a cautious reception. As supplies at St Peter and St Paul were limited, a group including Gore, King, and Webber travelled by boat and sledge to Bolcheretsk. They received a warm welcome, and Major Behm promised as much help as possible. Supplies included flour, cattle, and gifts of clothing and tobacco. The English offered small presents in return, and Behm said he was following his Empress’s policy of treating allies with courtesy. The English doctors also treated many locals for scurvy using ship’s stores, which helped their recovery.

Major Behm reported that the Chukchi, previously hostile to Russians, had recently sent an embassy to ratify a treaty, attributing their change of heart to a visit from two large ships the previous summer. These ships were identified as Cook’s expedition. On 13 June, the ships set out again to attempt finding a northern passage to Europe. Tides and winds delayed their progress, and a volcanic eruption on 15 June covered the ships in ash and cinders. Fogs and ice hampered their way along the Asiatic coast. On 13 July, they crossed to the American side, hoping for better conditions, but made little progress beyond their previous year’s latitude due to persistent ice. They tried returning to the Asiatic side but fared no better, and on 27 July, Clerke decided to return to Awatska Bay for repairs. Clerke’s health worsened throughout the voyage. By 10 August, he was gravely ill and handed over command to King. Clerke died on 22 August, just before reaching the harbour, and was buried on 29 August with honours from both crews and the Russian garrison.

Following Clerke’s death, Gore took command of the Resolution, King was promoted to captain of the Discovery, and other officers were reassigned. The officers agreed that, given the poor condition of the ships and lack of stores, they should not attempt further exploration but return to England. After making repairs and acquiring limited provisions, the ships left Awatska Bay on 9 October. They passed the Kurile Islands but saw little due to bad weather, then reached Japan’s northern coast but made no contact. Forced away by weather, they sailed to Macao, arriving 1 December. After delays, they obtained supplies from Canton, where King also acquired some European newspapers.

Learning of war between England and France, they reinforced their ships, though reports said Cook’s ships would not be attacked by either side. The crew sold furs acquired on earlier voyages, earning about £2,000 in goods and money. Many sailors wanted to return to collect more furs. On 13 January 1780, they left Macao, passed through the Straits of Sunda, and stopped at Prince’s Island for water. They reached Simon’s Bay at the Cape of Good Hope on 11 April. On 9 May, they left Simon’s Bay with fresh supplies. Ireland was sighted on 12 August, but weather forced them north. They arrived at Stromness, and King went overland to report to the Admiralty. The ships reached the Nore on 4 October, completing an absence of over four years and three month.

== Publication of journals ==
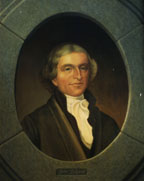
John Ledyard, author of A Journal of Captain Cook's Last Voyage, 1783

Cook's account of his third and final voyage was completed upon their return by James King. Cook's own journal ended abruptly on 17 January 1779, but those of his crew were handed to the Admiralty for editing before publication. In anticipation of the publication of his journal, Cook had spent much shipboard time rewriting it. The task of editing the account of the voyage was entrusted by the Admiralty to Dr John Douglas, Canon of St Paul's, who had the journals in his possession by November 1780. He added the journal of the surgeon, William Anderson, to the journals of Cook and James King. The final publication, in June 1784, amounted to three volumes, 1,617 pages, with 87 plates. Public interest in the account resulted in its selling out within three days, despite the high price of £4 14s 6d.

As on the earlier voyages, unofficial accounts written by members of the crew were produced. The first to appear, in 1781, was a narrative based on the journal of John Rickman entitled Journal of Captain Cook's Last Voyage. The German translation Tagebuch einer Entdekkungs Reise nach der Südsee in den Jahren 1776 bis 1780 unter Anführung der Capitains Cook, Clerke, Gore und King by Johann Reinhold Forster appeared in the same year. Heinrich Zimmermann published in 1781 his diary Reise um die Welt mit Capitain Cook. Then in 1782 an account by William Ellis, Surgeon's Mate on the Discovery, was published, followed in 1783 by John Ledyard's A Journal of Captain Cook's Last Voyage published in Connecticut.

== Bibliography ==
- Beaglehole, John Cawte (1974). The Life of Captain James Cook. A & C Black. ISBN 0-7136-1382-3.
- Collingridge, Vanessa (2002a). Captain Cook: The Life, Death and Legacy of History's Greatest Explorer. Ebury Press. ISBN 0-09-188898-0.
- Collingridge, Vanessa (2002b). Captain Cook: A Legacy under Fire. Guilford: Lyons Press. ISBN 1-58574-725-4.
- Connaughton, Richard Michael (2005). Omai: the Prince who never was. London: Timewell Press. ISBN 1-857-25205-5.
- Fisher, Robin (1979). Captain James Cook and his times. Taylor & Francis. ISBN 9780709900504.
- Hayes, Derek (1999). Historical Atlas of the Pacific Northwest: Maps of exploration and Discovery. Sasquatch Books. ISBN 1-57061-215-3.
- Cook, James (1821). Third Voyage. The three Voyages of Captain James Cook. Vol. V. A. & R. Spottiswoode: London.
- Hough, Richard (1994). Captain James Cook. Hodder and Stoughton. ISBN 0-340-82556-1.
- Hough, Richard (1979). The Murder of Captain James Cook. London: Macmillan. ISBN 0-333-23477-4.
- McLynn, Frank (2011). Captain Cook: Master of the Seas. Yale University Press. ISBN 978-0-300-11421-8.
- Obeyesekere, Gananath (1992). The Apotheosis of Captain Cook: European Mythmaking in the Pacific. Princeton University Press. ISBN 0-691-05752-4.
- Rigby, Nigel; van der Merwe, Pieter (2002). Captain Cook in the Pacific. London: National Maritime Museum. ISBN 0-948065-43-5.
- Villiers, Alan (1967). Captain Cook. The Seaman's Seaman. London: Penguin Books. ISBN 0-14-139062-X.
- Williams, Glyndwr (1997). Captain Cook's Voyages: 1768–1779. London: The Folio Society.
- Williams, Glyndwr (2004). Captain Cook: Explorations and Reassessments's. Woodbridge, Suffolk: Boydell Press. ISBN 1-84383-100-7.
- Williams, Glyndwr (2008). The Death of Captain Cook: A Hero Made and Unmade. London: Profile Books. ISBN 978-1-86197-842-4.
- Withey, Lynne (1987). Voyages of Discovery : Captain Cook and the Exploration of the Pacific. New York: Morrow. ISBN 0-688-05115-4.
