= Charles Clerke =

British Royal Navy officer

Captain Charles Clerke
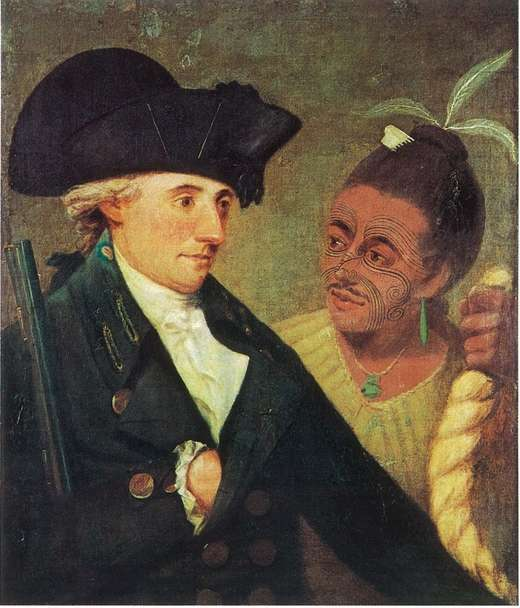
- Charles Clerke, by Nathaniel Dance-Holland, 1776
- Born: 22 August 1741; Essex, England
- Died: 22 August 1779 (aged 38) Kamchatka, Russia
- Allegiance: United Kingdom
- Branch: Royal Navy
- Rank: Captain
- Commands: HMS Discovery; HMS Resolution
- Conflicts: Seven Years' War

Captain Charles Clerke RN (22 August 1741 – 22 August 1779) was an officer in the Royal Navy who sailed on four voyages of exploration (including three circumnavigations), three with Captain James Cook. When Cook was killed during his 3rd expedition to the Pacific, Clerke took command but died later in the voyage from tuberculosis.

== Biography ==
Clerke started studying at the Royal Naval Academy in Portsmouth when he was 13. During the Seven Years' War he served aboard HMS Dorsetshire and HMS Bellona. He was in the mizzen-top of HMS Bellona when the mast was shot away in 1761 and he became the only survivor of those who consequently fell overboard.

In June 1764 he joined Captain John Byron, aboard HMS Dolphin, on Byron's expedition to explore the Pacific. The Dolphin returned in May 1766. Its circumnavigation of 22 months was the quickest up to that point. Upon his return Clerke published an account of encountering Patagonian giants, a hoax which the Dictionary of Canadian Biography attributed to his high spirits.

Clerke's last three voyages were all under the command of Captain James Cook. He started the first voyage aboard HM Bark Endeavour (1768–1771) as a master's mate. Cook promoted him to acting lieutenant in 1771, and he was officially confirmed in that rank on 31 July 1771. He was HMS Resolution's second lieutenant on Cook's second voyage (1772–1775).

While ashore between Cook's 2nd and 3rd voyages Clerke agreed to serve time in the King's Bench debtor's prison for a debt one of his brothers, Sir John Clerke had incurred. While in debtor's prison he was infected with the tuberculosis that eventually killed him.

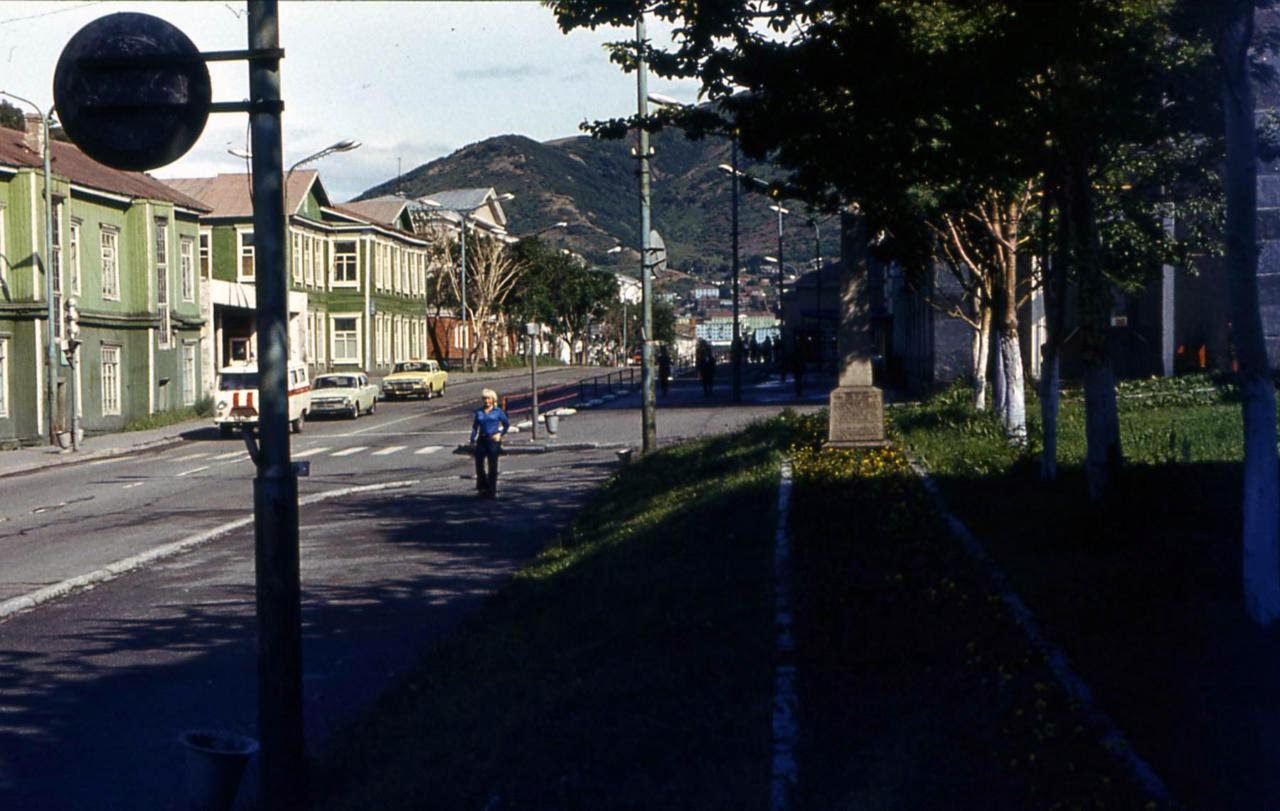
The grave of Charles Clerke (on the right) in the centre of the city of Petropavlovsk-Kamchatsky in Russia.

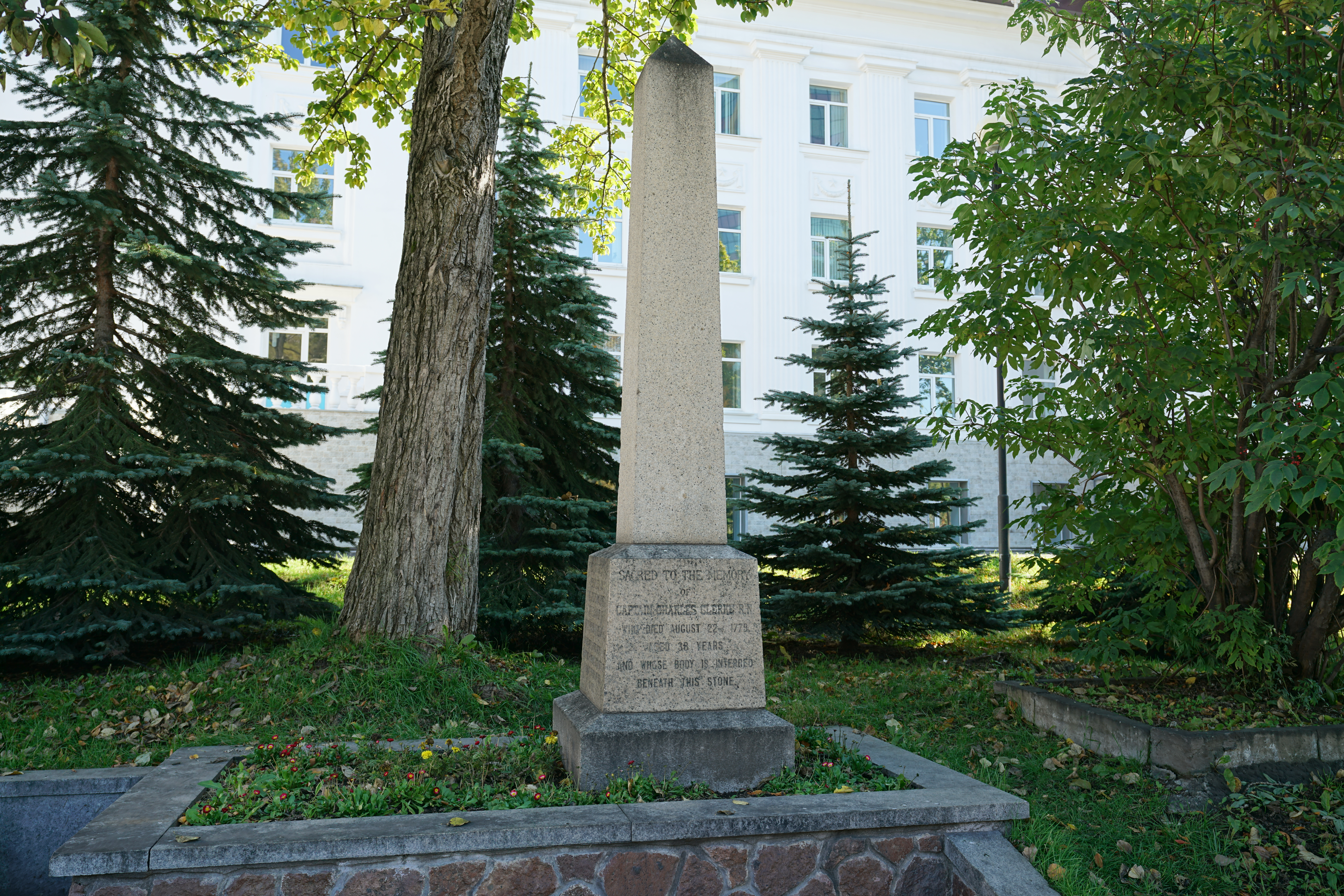
Obelisk marking the grave

For Cook's third expedition, Clerke was placed in command of HMS Discovery, receiving this command on 26 August 1775. When Cook was killed in a skirmish with Hawaiians on 14 February 1779, Clerke took command of the expedition and of HMS Resolution. He continued the expedition's exploration of the Northern Pacific coast, searching for a navigable Northwest Passage. The expedition then proceeded to the Pacific coast of Siberia. Lieutenant James King, one of his subordinates, wrote that Clerke's illness had reduced him to skeletal thinness. On 10 August 1779, Clerke wrote in a letter to Sir Joseph Banks that, "The disorder I was attacked with in the King's bench prison has proved consumptive, with which I have battled with various [unclear] although without one single days health since I took leave of you ... it has now so far got the better of me that I am not able to turn myself in bed, so that my stay in this world must be of very short duration." Clerke died from tuberculosis on his 38th birthday (22 August 1779) en route to Kamchatka from the Bering Strait. He was buried in Kamchatka on 29 August 1779. Clerke's second in command, Lieutenant John Gore took command of the expedition as captain of Resolution, appointing King as captain of Discovery. The expedition then sailed via China and the Sunda Strait to Cape Town, returning to England in August 1780.

In 1913, the British Admiralty erected a small obelisk in Clerke's honour at Petropavlovsk-Kamchatsky, Russia, with an inscription in English.

== See also ==
- European and American voyages of scientific exploration
