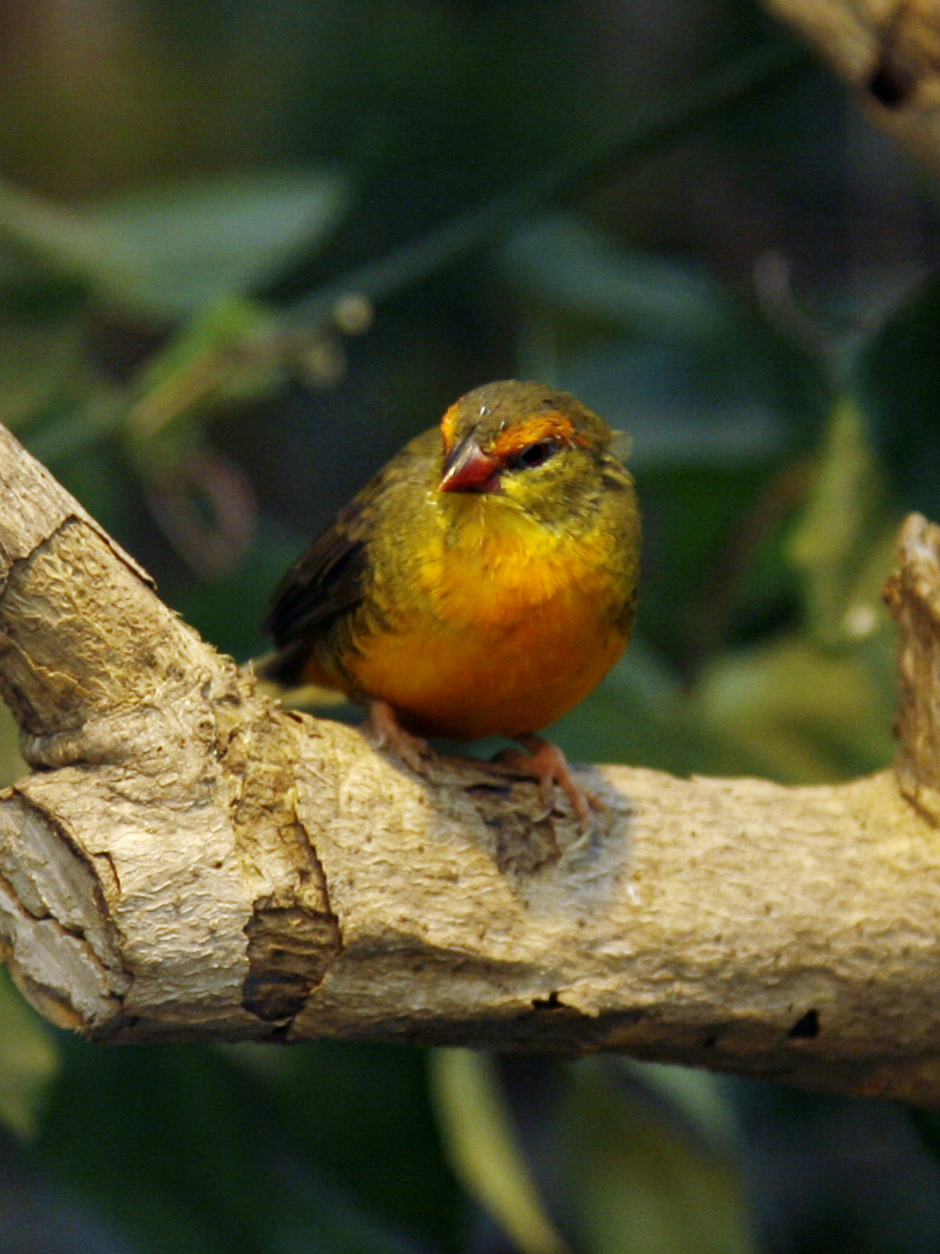

Conservation status
- Least Concern (IUCN 3.1)

Scientific classification
- Kingdom: Animalia
- Phylum: Chordata
- Class: Aves
- Order: Passeriformes
- Family: Estrildidae
- Genus: Amandava
- Species: A. subflava

Binomial name
- Amandava subflava (Vieillot, 1819)

Synonyms
- Sporaeginthus subflavus

= Orange-breasted waxbill =

Species of bird

The orange-breasted waxbill (Amandava subflava), also known as the zebra waxbill, is a small (approximately 9 cm long) sparrow-like bird with a reddish iris, orange breast, red bill and dark olive-green plumage. The male has a red rump, dark bars on the whitish flank and a scarlet eyebrow stripe. The female is duller and smaller than male; it also lacks the male's red eyebrow.

The orange-breasted waxbill is found in grassland and savannahs south of the Sahara in Africa. It has an estimated global extent of occurrence of 10,000,000 km^{2}. This species is also introduced to other countries, e.g., Kuwait. Its diet consists mainly of seeds, insects and shoots. The female usually lays between four and six eggs in an oval-shaped nest made from grass. These nests are often the old nests of red-collared widowbirds.

Widespread and common throughout its large range, the orange-breasted waxbill is evaluated to be of least concern on the IUCN Red List of Threatened Species. It is listed on Appendix III of CITES in Ghana.

== Gallery ==
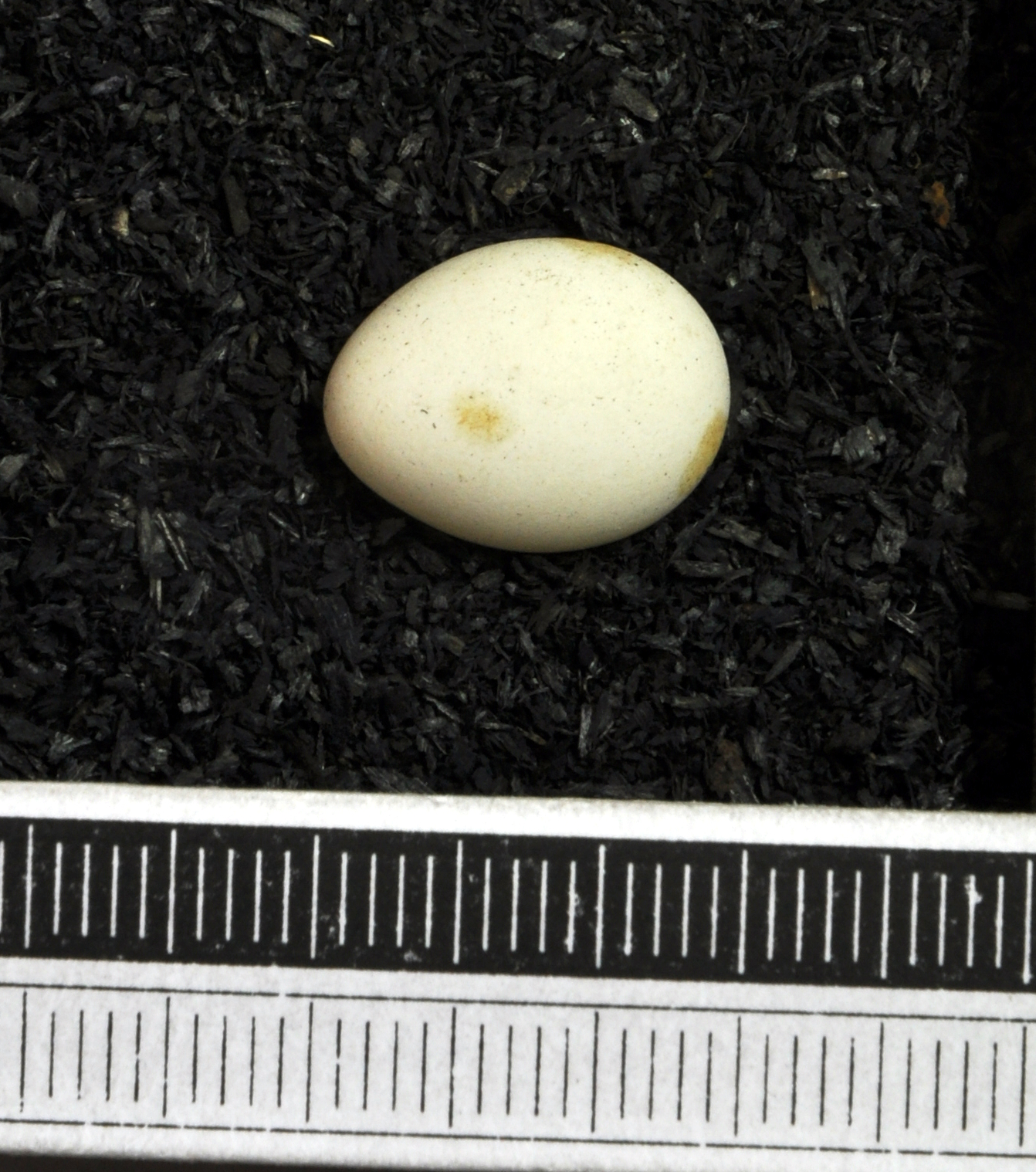
Egg, Collection Museum Wiesbaden

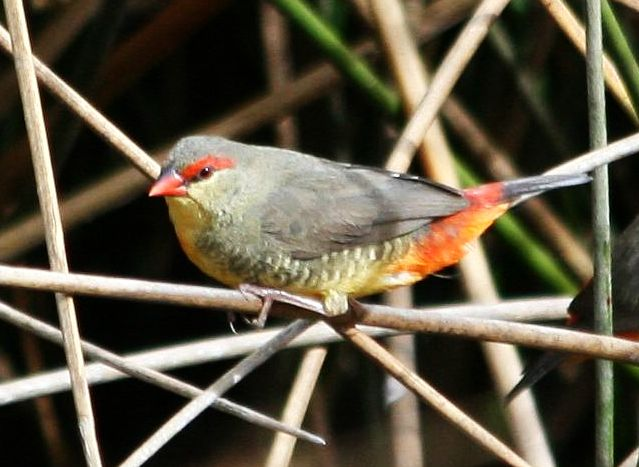
A male, photographed at Cedara farm, Pietermaritzburg, South Africa

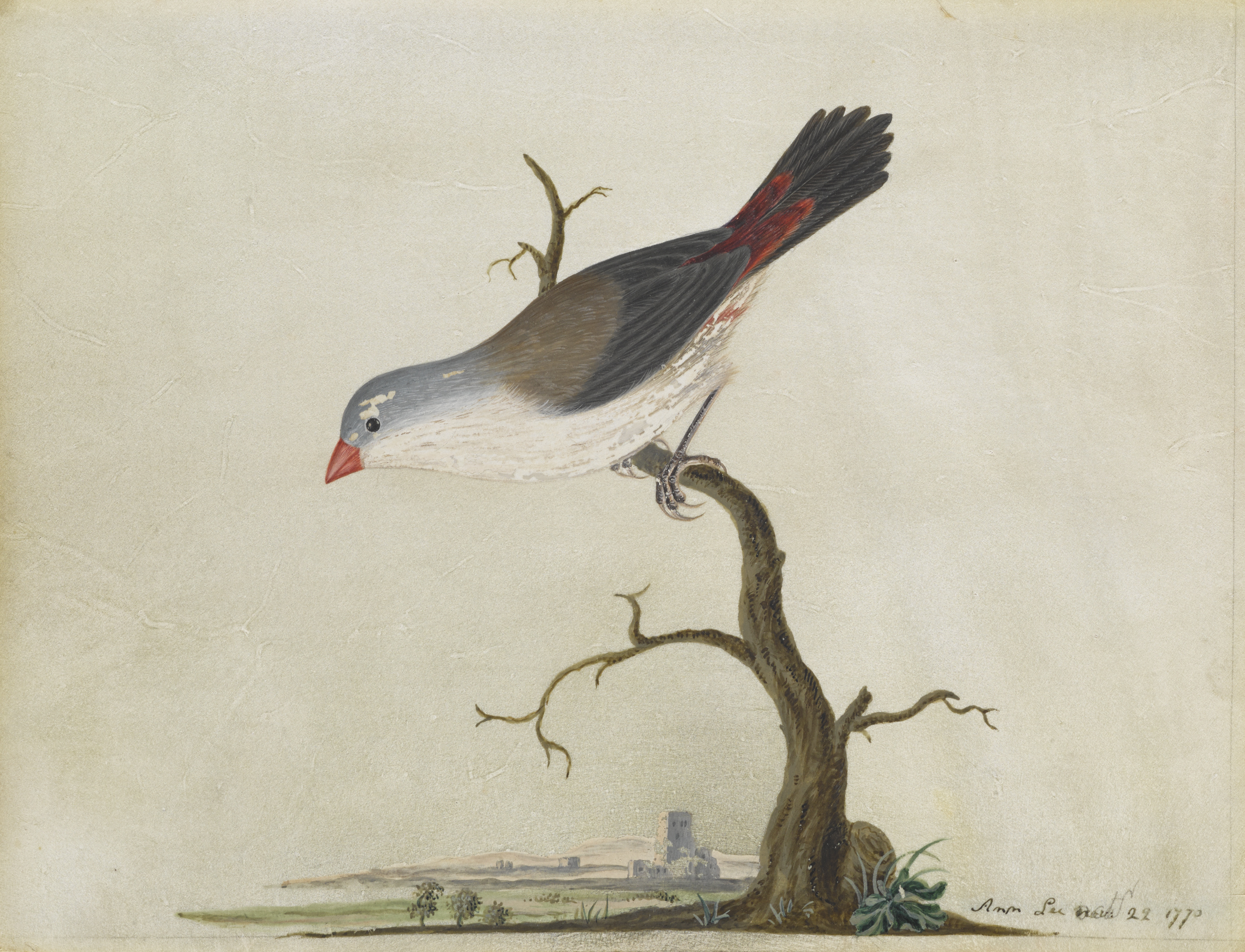
Amandava subflava by Ann Lee

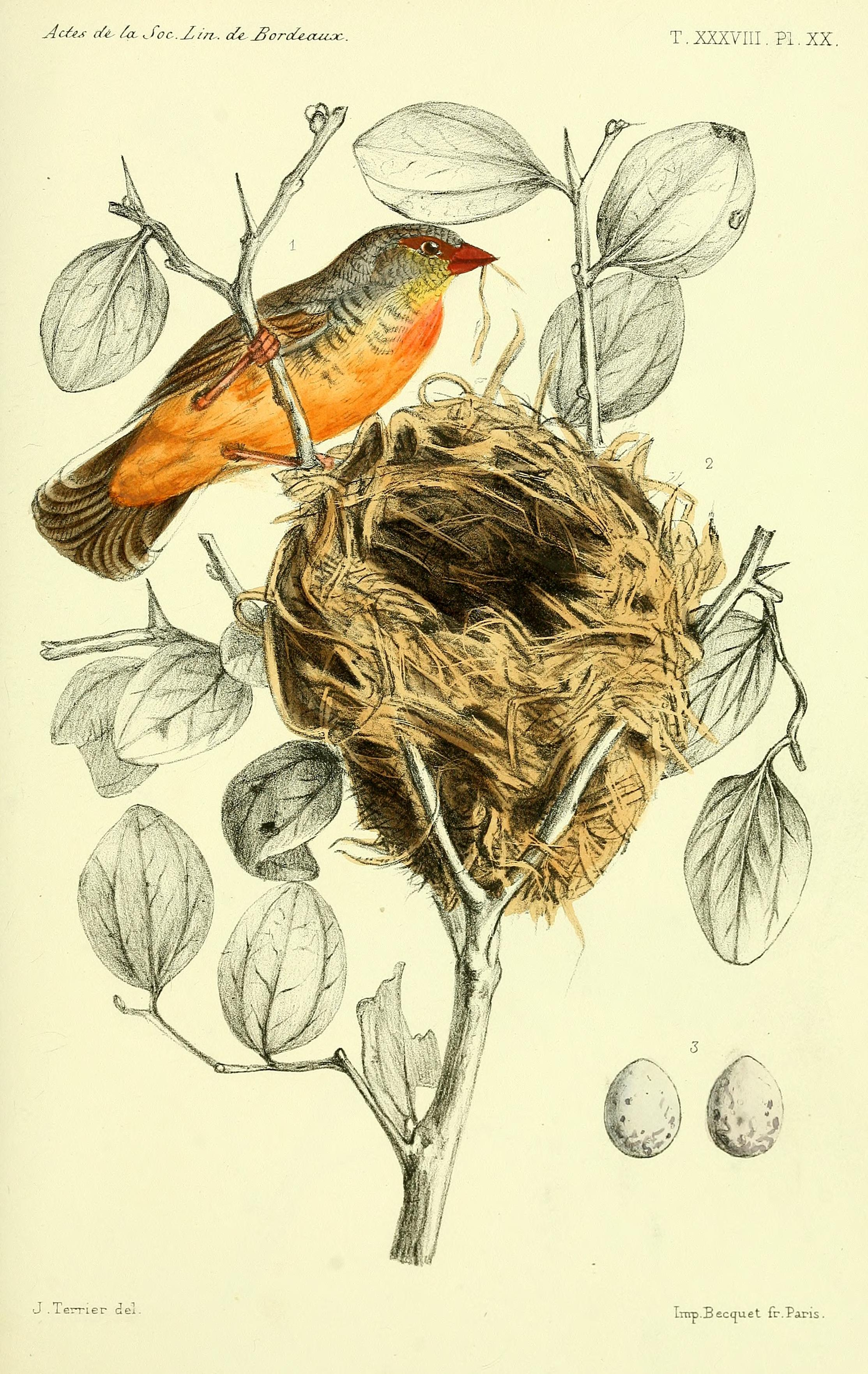
Adult, egg and nest
