= Sydney Parkinson =

Scottish scientific illustrator (1745–1771)

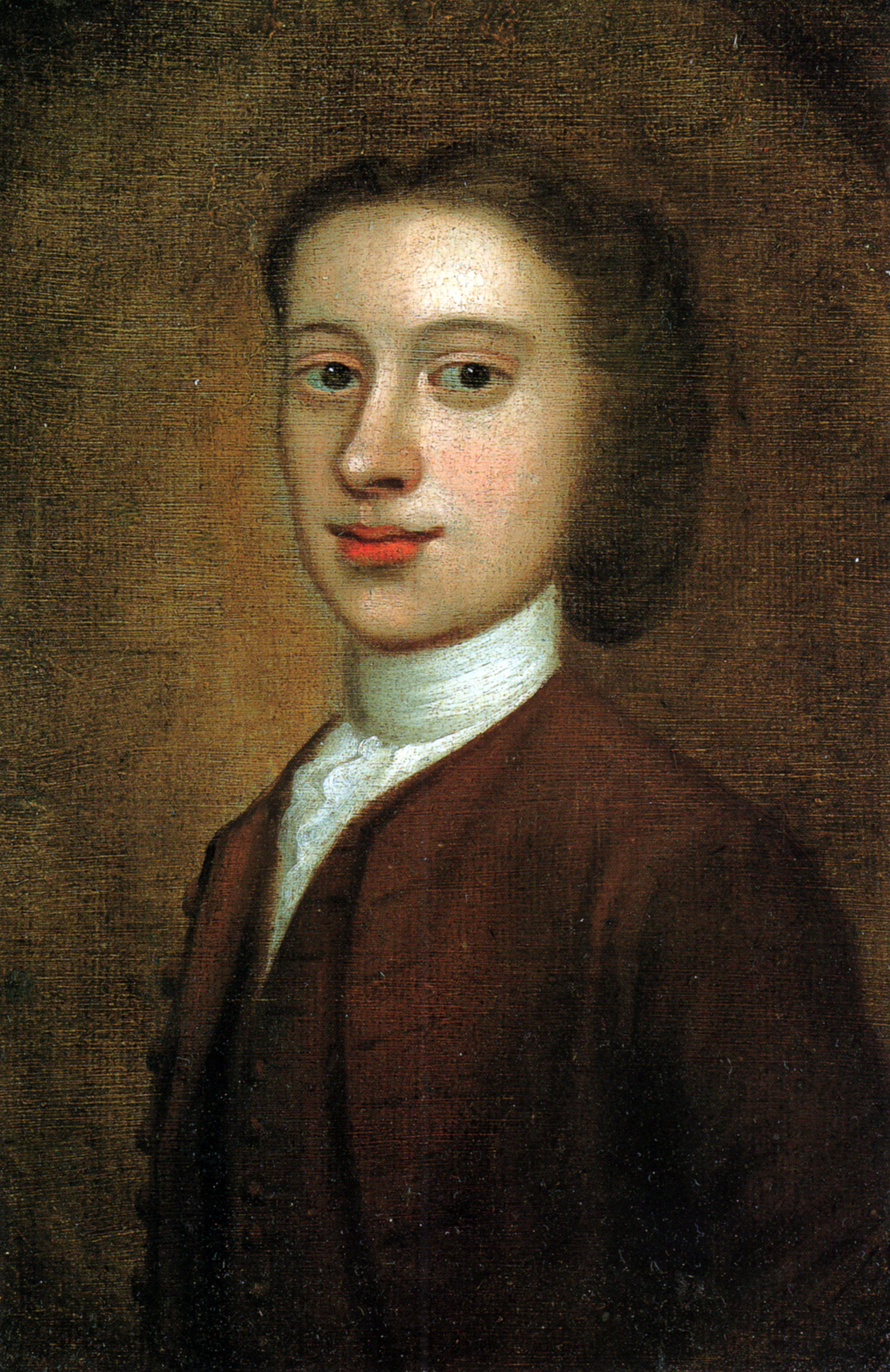
- Self-portrait
- Born: c. 1745; Edinburgh, Scotland, Great Britain
- Died: 26 January 1771 (aged c. 26); Indian Ocean

Sydney Parkinson (c. 1745 – 26 January 1771) was a Scottish botanical illustrator and natural history artist. He was the first European artist to visit Australia, New Zealand and Tahiti. Parkinson was the first Quaker to visit New Zealand. The standard author abbreviation Parkinson is used to indicate this person as the author when citing a botanical name.

== Early life and family ==
Parkinson was born in Edinburgh; his parents were the Edinburgh brewer Joel Parkinson, a Quaker, and his wife Elizabeth. His birth year is usually given as c. 1745, but is somewhat suspect as his mother was born c. 1700. He had a brother, Stanfield, and a sister, whose name was Britannia. The parents were members of the Edinburgh meeting of Quakers; John Fothergill was another member. Parkinson's father died in 1749, leaving the family in financial difficulties. Parkinson became apprentice of a woollen draper. According to his brother, he took "a particular delight in drawing flowers, fruits and other objects of natural history", becoming "so great a proficient in that stile of painting, as to attract the notice of the most celebrated botanists." While no direct evidence exists that Parkinson received formal training in art, he has been connected to William Delacour, who taught drawing and design at the Trustees' Academy, and may have been influenced by other Edinburgh artists.

== London ==
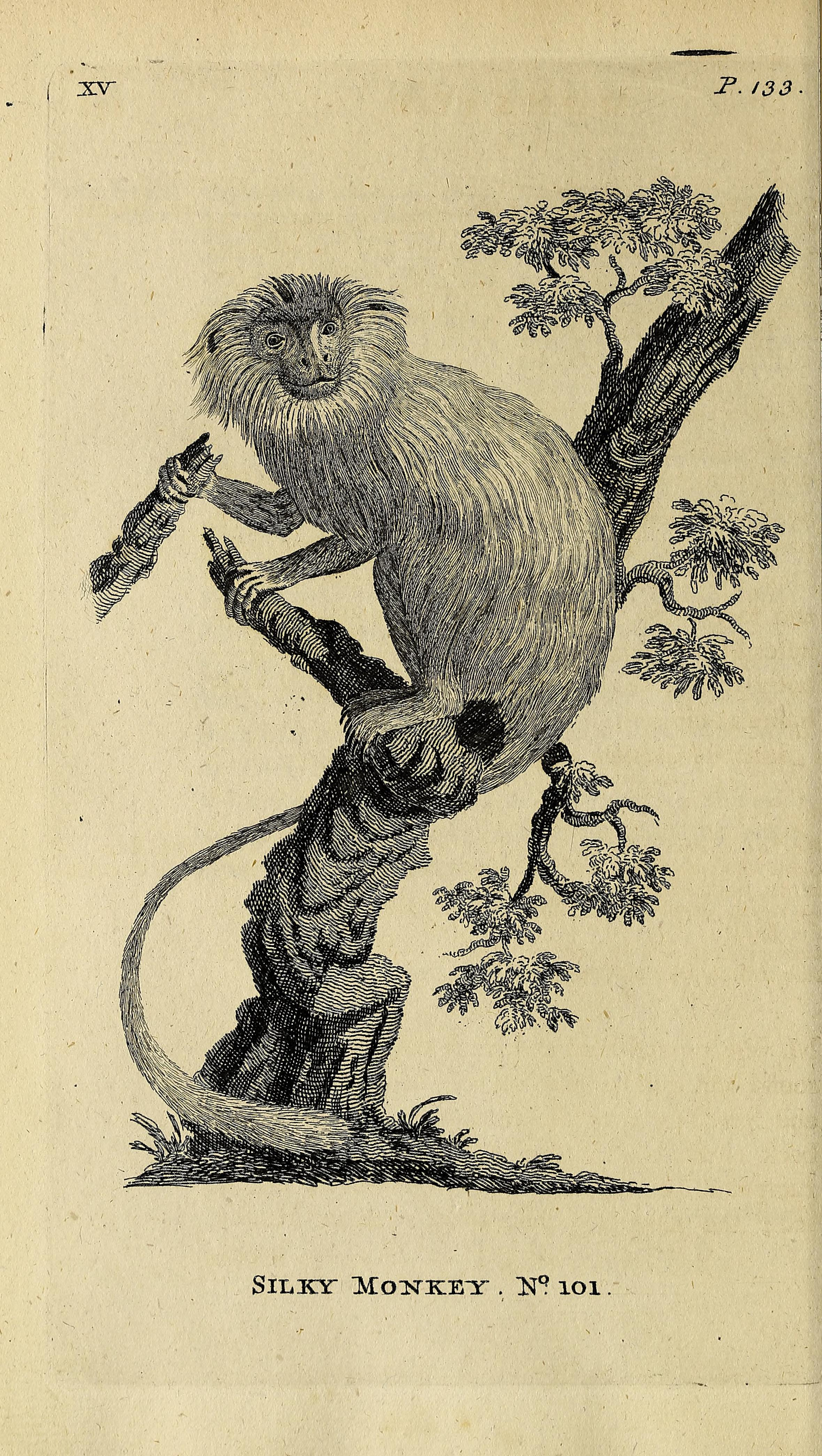
Silky monkey, illustration in Thomas Pennant's 1771 book Synopsis of Quadrupeds based on a painting by Parkinson.

The family moved to London c. 1766, where Parkinson's brother Stanfield worked as an upholsterer. In 1765 and 1766, some of Parkinson's flower paintings and drawings were shown at Free Society of Artists exhibitions. Parkinson began to give drawing lessons, and the Scottish nurseryman James Lee, a fellow Quaker, employed him as teacher to his daughter Ann. Lee introduced Parkinson to Joseph Banks in 1767. Through Banks, Parkinson also established contact with the zoologist Thomas Pennant. Parkinson produced copies of some animal paintings in the collection of Joan Gideon Loten, which were later published in some of Pennant's zoological books. His watercolours of birds of the Loten collection were painted in 1767, either from specimens or from drawings. Together with a fellow artist, Peter Paillou, Parkinson worked for Banks on the latter's collections from his 1766 voyage to Newfoundland and Labrador. He produced drawings and watercolour paintings of animals, from specimens preserved in alcohol or stuffed birds. When Banks planned a voyage to Sweden in order to meet Linnaeus in Uppsala and to see Lapland, he intended to take Parkinson as his draughtsman.

== Voyage with Captain Cook ==
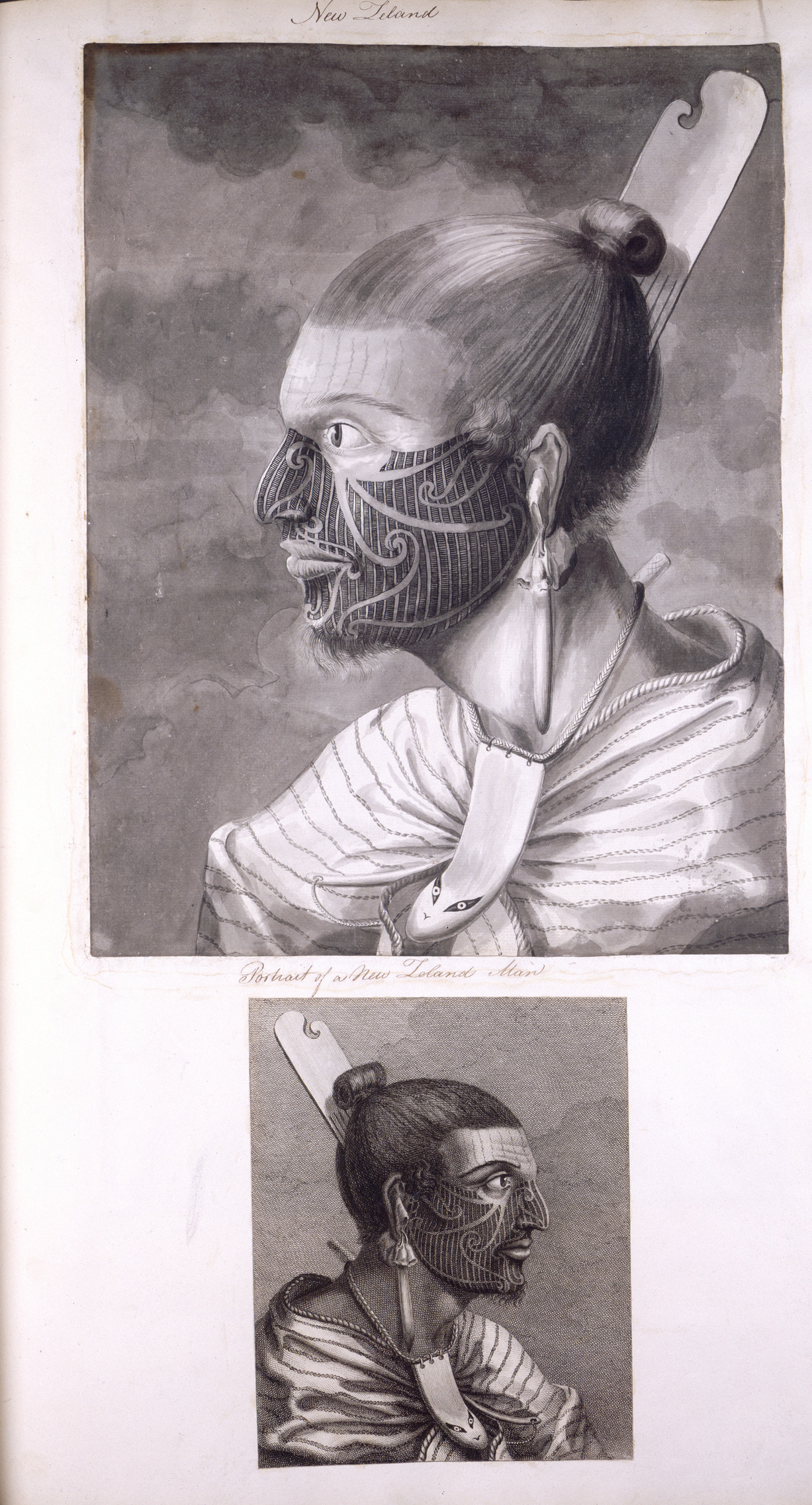
Portrait of Otegoowgoow, son of a chief of the Bay of Islands. He has a comb in his hair, an ornament of green stone in his ear, and another of a fish's tooth round his neck. Drawing by Parkinson 1769 above, 1773 engraving below.

Parkinson was employed by Joseph Banks to travel with him on James Cook's first voyage to the Pacific in 1768, in HMS Endeavour. Parkinson made nearly a thousand drawings of plants and animals collected by Banks and Daniel Solander on the voyage. He had to work in difficult conditions, living and working in a small cabin surrounded by hundreds of specimens. In Tahiti, he was plagued by swarms of flies which ate the paint as he worked. He died at sea on the way to Cape Town of dysentery contracted at Princes' Island off the western end of Java. Banks paid his outstanding salary to his brother.

Before his travels, Parkinson had taught illustration to Ann Lee, daughter of James Lee a Hammersmith nurseryman for whom he had made illustrations. In his will Parkinson left "whatever utensils that are useful in painting or drawing to Mr. Lee’s daughter, my scholar."

== Journal ==
Parkinson kept a journal on board the ship until shortly before his death in January 1771. While the fair copy of the journal was lost and never found, Stanfield Parkinson obtained some of his brother's papers from Banks in 1773, and decided to publish them earlier than John Hawkesworth's official publication of Cook's and Banks's journals. A legal injunction obtained by Hawkesworth prevented the publication until two days after his book had appeared on 10 June 1773.

== Legacy ==
Parkinson is commemorated in the common and scientific name of the Parkinson's petrel Procellaria parkinsoni. The great Florilegium of his work was finally published in 1988 by Alecto Historical Editions in 35 volumes and has since been digitized by the Natural History Museum in London.

In 1986, he was honoured on a postage stamp depicting his portrait issued by Australia Post.

The following are some examples of Parkinson's artistic work:

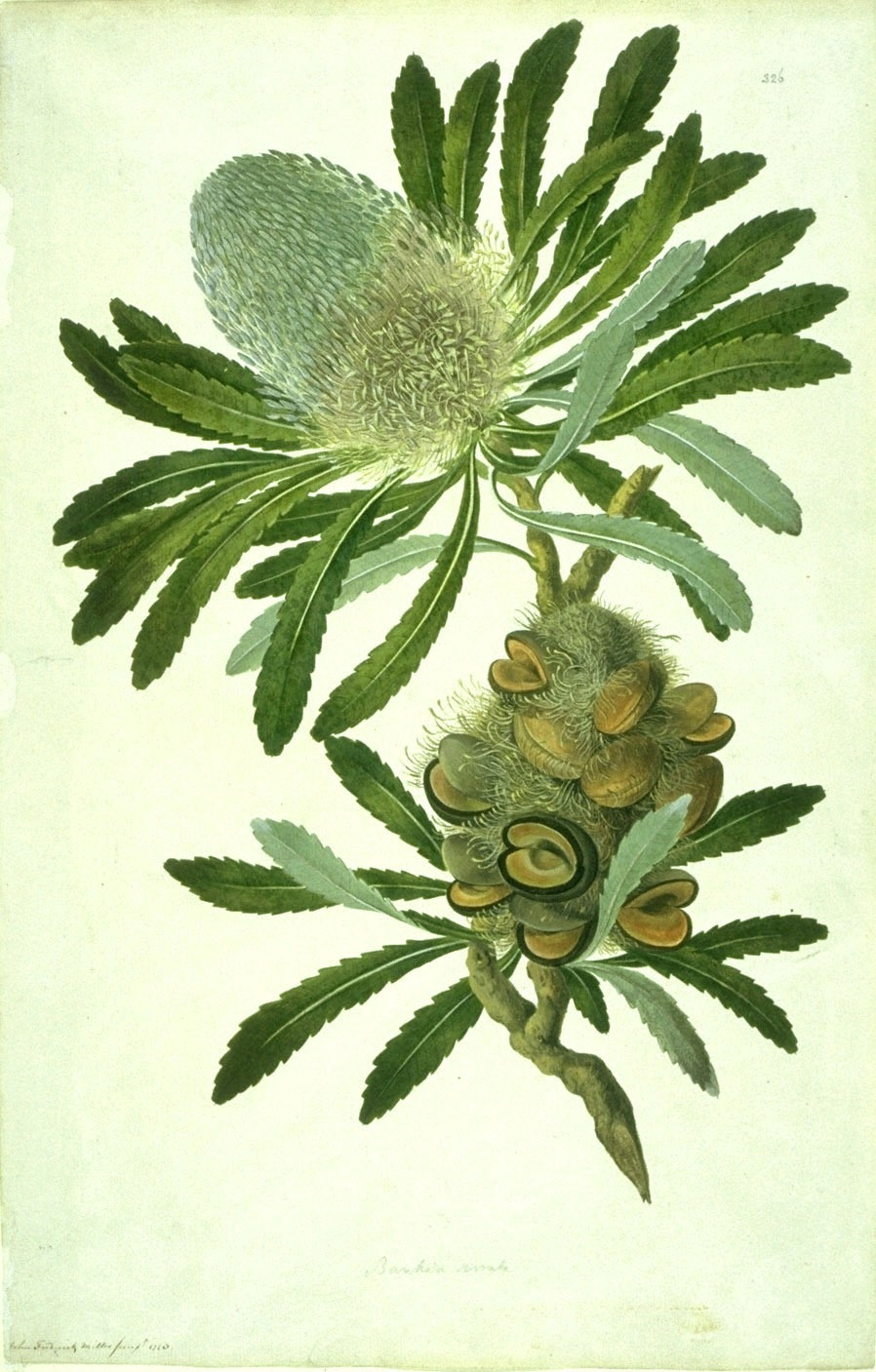
Banksia serrata

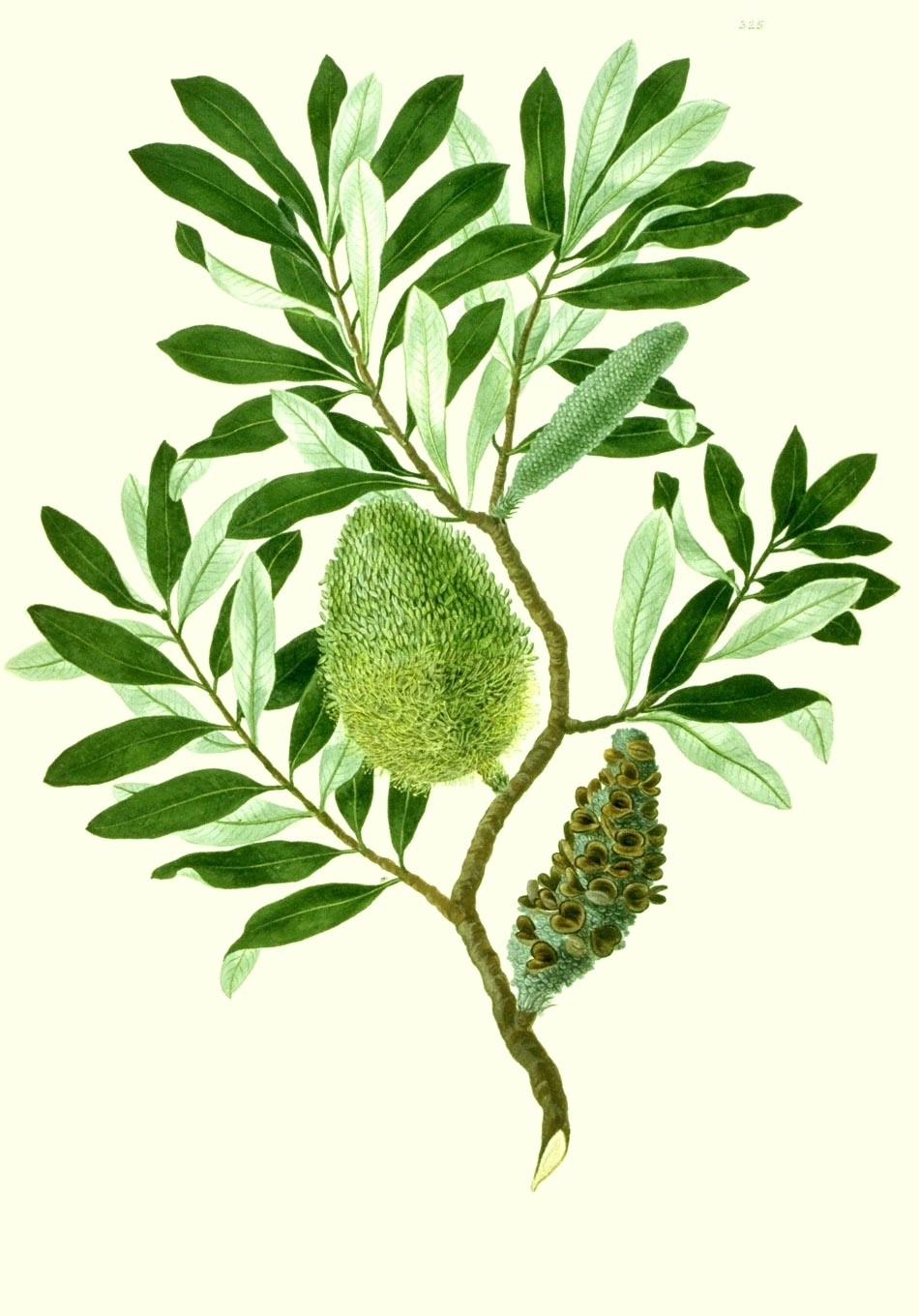
Banksia integrifolia

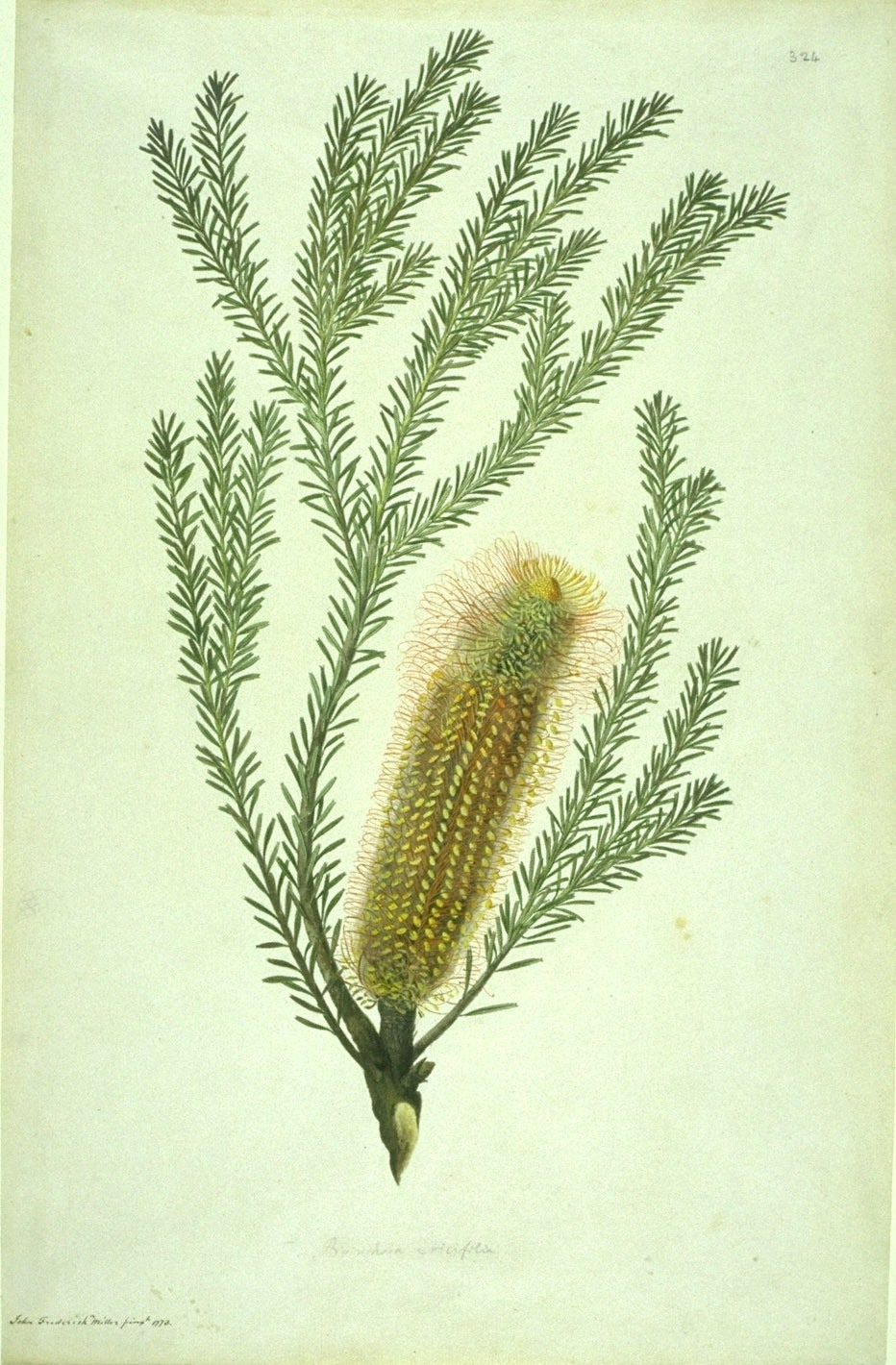
Banksia ericifolia

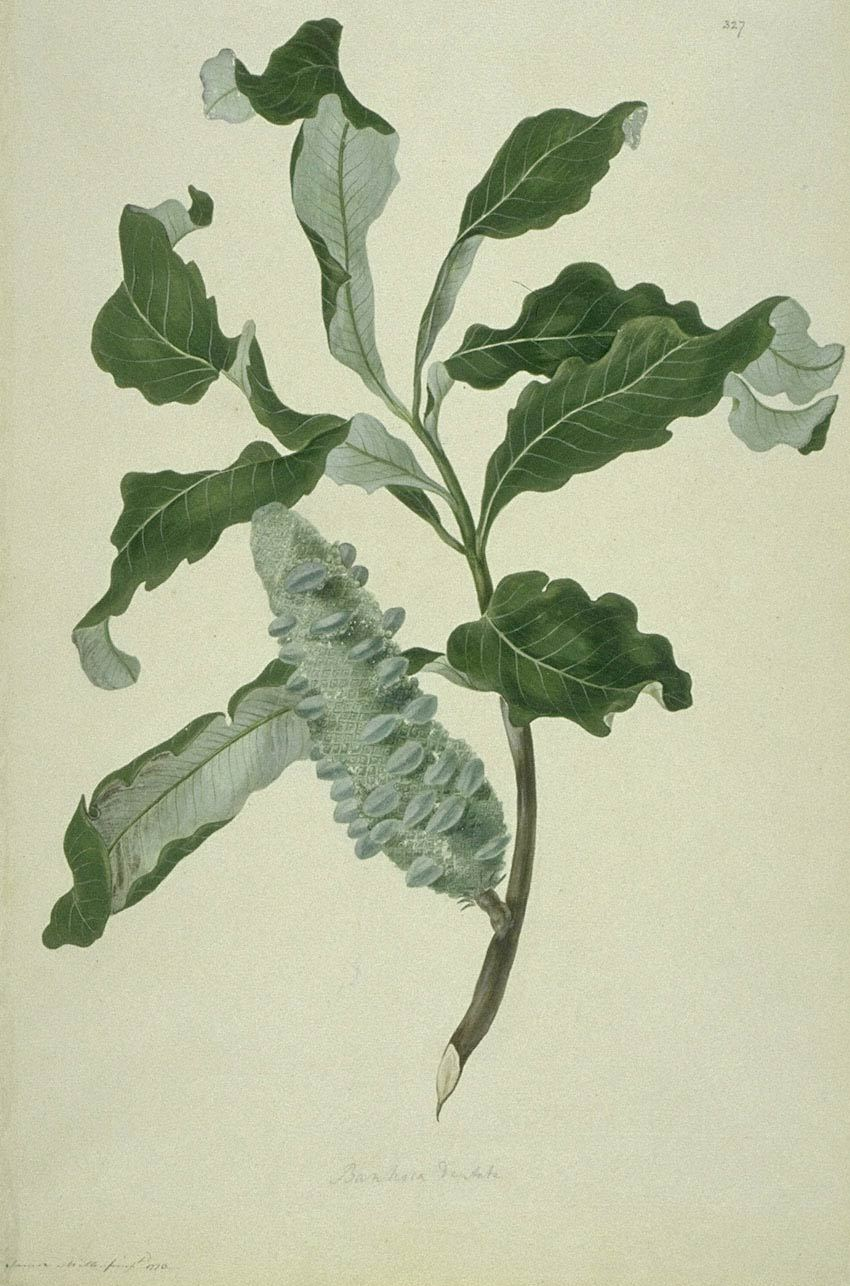
Banksia dentata

== See also ==
- Visual arts of Australia
- List of Australian botanical illustrators
- European and American voyages of scientific exploration

== Sources ==
- Allen, D.E. (23 September 2004). "Parkinson, Sydney". The Oxford Dictionary of National Biography. Oxford: Oxford University Press. doi:10.1093/ref:odnb/21377.
- Anderson, A. W. (16 January 1954). "Sydney Parkinson". The Gardeners' Chronicle. 135. London: 24–25. OCLC 12835111.
- Beaglehole, John C. (1968) [1955]. The Journals of Captain James Cook: The Voyage of the Endeavour, 1768–1771. Cambridge: Cambridge University Press : Hakluyt Society. OCLC 223185477.
- Beaglehole, J. C (1963). The Endeavour journal of Joseph Banks 1768-1771. Sydney: Trustees of Public Library of N.S.W. in association with Angus and Robertson. OCLC 222980498.
- Beaglehole, J. C (1974). The life of Captain James Cook. London: Adam & Charles Black. OCLC 480115019.
- Carr, Denis J. (1983). Sydney Parkinson: Artist of Cook's Endeavour Voyage. British Museum (Natural History). ISBN 978-0-7099-0794-7.
- Elphick, Jonathan (2008). Birds : the art of ornithology. New York : Rizzoli. ISBN 978-0-8478-3134-0.
- Graves, Algernon (1907). The Society of artists of Great Britain, 1760-1791; the Free society of artists, 1761-1783; a complete dictionary of contributors and their work from the foundation of the societies to 1791. London: G. Bell and sons etc.
- Joppien, Rüdiger; Smith, Bernard (1985). The Art of Captain Cook's Voyages. Vol. One. The Voyage of the Endeavour 1768–1771. New Haven and London: Published for the Paul Mellon Centre for Studies in British Art by Yale University Press. ISBN 0-300-03450-4. OCLC 12544694.
- Lysaght, Averil M. (1971). Joseph Banks in Newfoundland and Labrador, 1766: his diary, manuscripts and collections;. London: Faber and Faber Ltd. ISBN 978-0-571-09351-9.
- Lysaght, Averil M. (1979). "Banks's artists and his Endeavour collections". In Mitchell, T. C. (ed.). Captain Cook and the South Pacific. British Museum Yearbook. Vol. 3. London: British Museum Publications Ltd. pp. 9–80. ISBN 978-0-7141-0088-3.
- O'Brian, Patrick (1993). Joseph Banks : a life. Boston : D.R. Godine. ISBN 978-0-87923-930-5.
- Sox, David (2002). "Sydney Parkinson (1745-1771): Quaker artist with Cook's Endeavour voyage". The Journal of the Friends Historical Society. 59 (3): 231–235.
