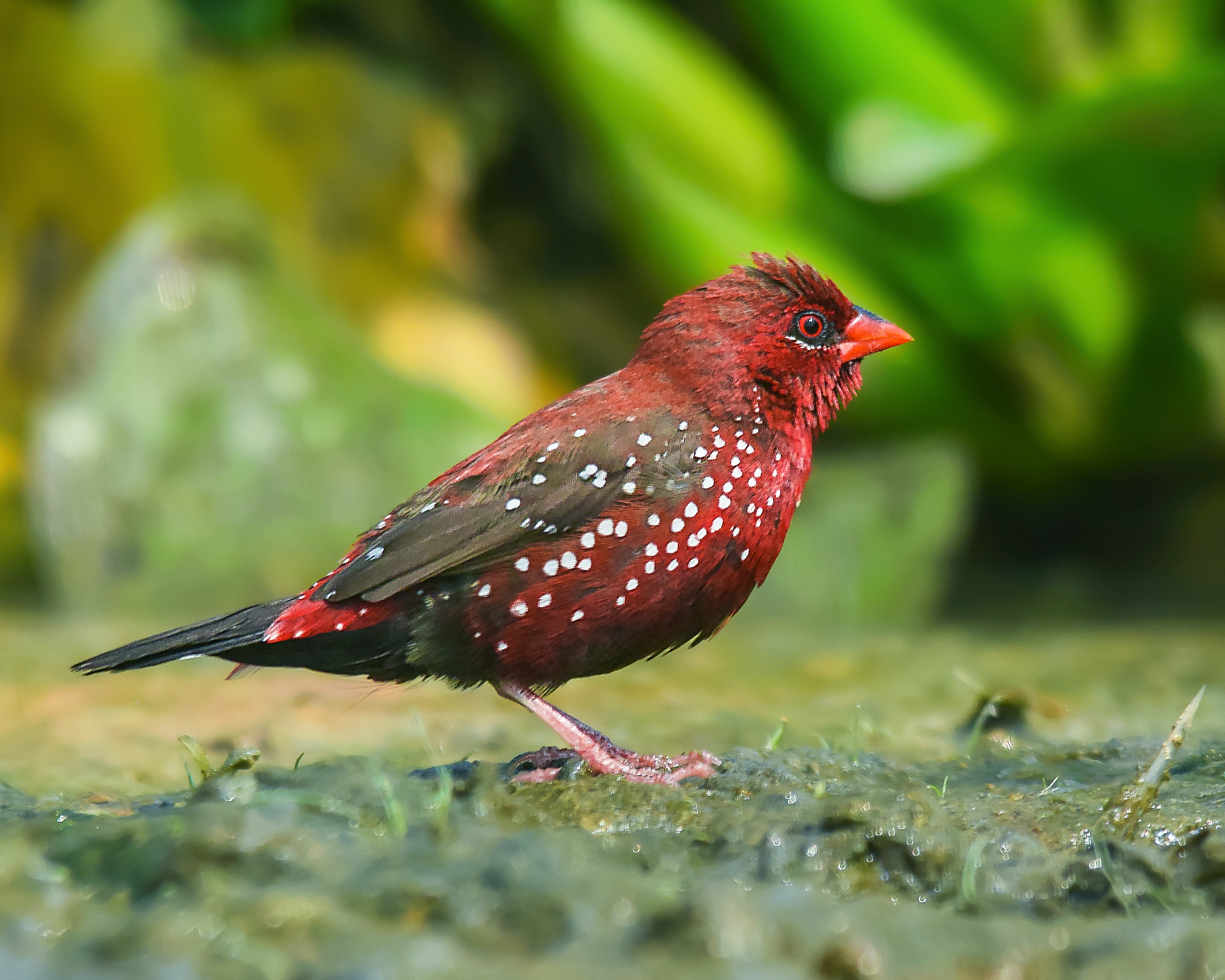
- Male red avadavat (Amandava amandava)
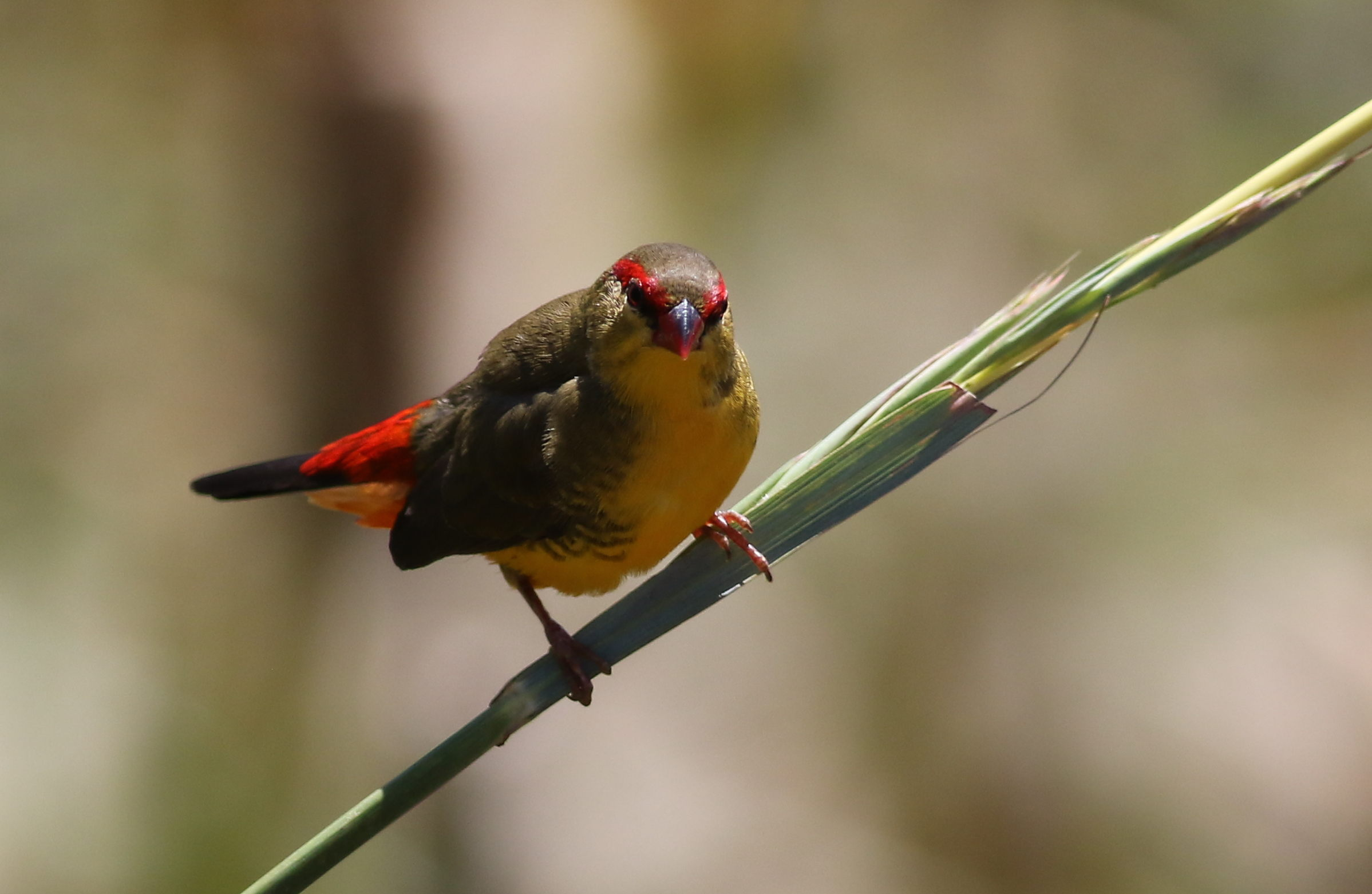
- orange-breasted waxbill (Amandava subflava)

Scientific classification
- Kingdom: Animalia
- Phylum: Chordata
- Class: Aves
- Order: Passeriformes
- Family: Estrildidae
- Genus: Amandava; Blyth, 1836

Type species
- Amandava punctata = Fringilla amandava Blyth, 1836

Species
- A. amandava A. formosa A. subflava

= Amandava =

Genus of birds

Amandava is a genus of the estrildid finches. These birds are found in dense grass or scrub in Africa and South Asia. They are gregarious seed-eaters with short, red bills. In earlier literature, amadavat and amidavad have been used. The name amandava, along with amadavat and amidavad are all corruptions of Ahmedabad, a city in Gujarat, India, from where the first few specimens of the red munia Amandava amandava were obtained.

== Taxonomy ==
The genus Amandava was introduced in 1836 by the English zoologist Edward Blyth for the red avadavat. The genus is mentioned in a footnote to a page of an edition of Gilbert White's The Natural History and Antiquities of Selborne that Blythe edited. The name is derived by tautomony with the binomial name Fringilla amandava introduced for the red avadavat by Carl Linnaeus in 1758. The word amandava is a corruption of Ahmedabad, a city in the Indian state of Gujarat. The genus Amandava is sister to the genus Amadina containing two African finches.

=== Species ===
The genus contains the following three species:

Genus Amandava – Blyth, 1836 – three species
Common name	Scientific name and subspecies	Range	Size and ecology	IUCN status and estimated population
Red avadavat or red munia Male Female	Amandava amandava (Linnaeus, 1758) Three subspecies: A. a. amandava (Linnaeus, 1758) – Pakistan, India, Nepal and Bangladesh; A. a. flavidiventris (Wallace, 1864) – Myanmar, south China, northwest, central Thailand and the Lesser Sundas; A. a. punicea (Horsfield, 1821)	Bangladesh, India, Nepal and Pakistan	Size: Habitat: Diet:	LC
Green avadavat or green munia	Amandava formosa (Latham, 1790)	central India, around southern Rajasthan, specifically around Oriya village, central Uttar Pradesh, southern Bihar and West Bengal	Size: Habitat: Diet:	VU
Orange-breasted waxbill or zebra waxbill	Amandava subflava (Vieillot, 1819)	south of the Sahara in Africa	Size: Habitat: Diet:	LC

The two avadavats, which are very closely related, are found in tropical South Asia, and the waxbill in Africa. Various members of this genus are sometimes placed in Sporaeginthus.
