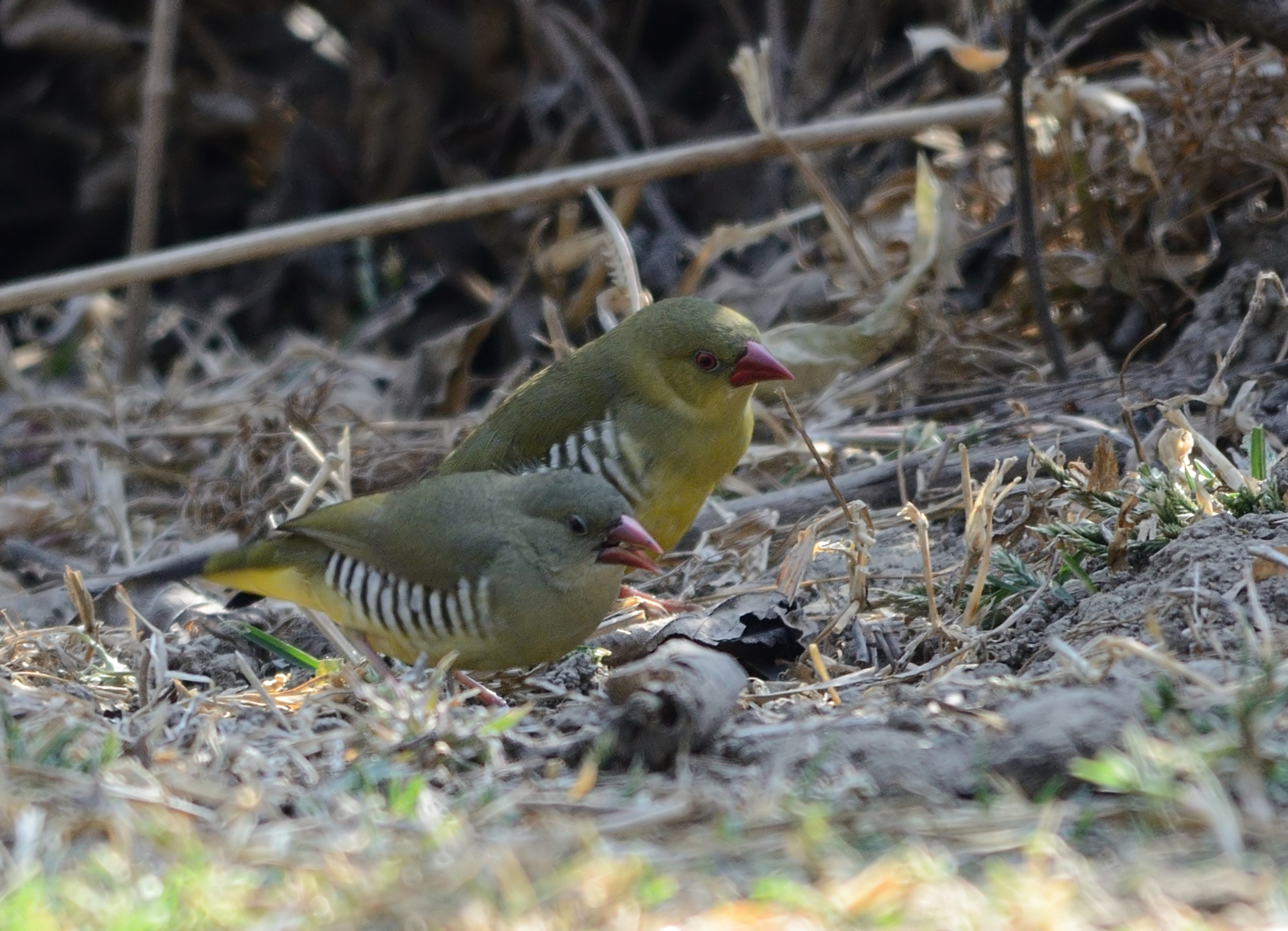
- A pair at Mt. Abu, India. The slightly duller female in foreground.

Conservation status
- Vulnerable (IUCN 3.1)
- CITES Appendix II

Scientific classification
- Kingdom: Animalia
- Phylum: Chordata
- Class: Aves
- Order: Passeriformes
- Family: Estrildidae
- Genus: Amandava
- Species: A. formosa

Binomial name
- Amandava formosa (Latham, 1790)
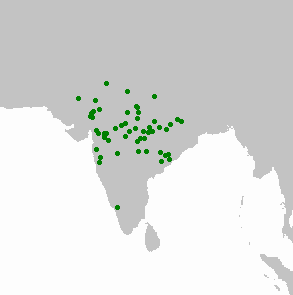

Synonyms
- Stictospiza formosa Estrilda formosa Sporaeginthus formosus

= Green avadavat =

Species of bird

The green avadavat or green munia (Amandava formosa) is a species of Estrildid finch with green and yellow on the body, a bright red bill and black "zebra stripes" on the flanks. They are endemic to the Indian subcontinent and were formerly popular as cagebirds. The name "avadavat" is a corruption of the name the city of Ahmedabad in Gujarat, India, which was a centre of bird trade. They have a restricted distribution and populations are threatened by the bird trade.

== Description ==

The green avadavat is approximately 10 cm long with green above, yellow below, black and white bars on the flank and reddish bill. Both sexes have pale tips to wing-coverts and tertials. The upper plumage is olive green. The upper tail coverts are more yellow and the tail is black and rounded with broad feathers. The chin is pale yellow and the lower breast, belly and vent are brighter yellow. The flanks are barred with brown and white. The bill is waxy red and the legs are pale fleshy or brown. The female is slightly paler than the male. Young birds are duller with a black bill and lack the barring on the flanks.

== Distribution ==
This species is found mainly in the dry scrub regions and agricultural lands and is often found close to water. The largest populations are in central and north-western India. A population of escaped birds once existed near Lahore. The key areas where they are well known are in central India, around southern Rajasthan specifically around Oriya village, central Uttar Pradesh, southern Bihar and West Bengal extending south to southern Maharashtra and northern Andhra Pradesh. At Mount Abu, additional site records were reported from Palanpur Point and Achalgarh in 2004, with further observations near Pandu Caves and the Teachers Training Centre. The observations included birds using agricultural land, tall grasses, bushes and semi-evergreen vegetation. Some records are from further south from Wynaad in northern Kerala but it is unclear if these are wild populations.

== Behaviour and ecology ==
They breed in central India from October to January but are also known to breed in July. The nest is made out of broad leaves of grass or sugarcane and is spherical with an entrance on the side. The adaptability for altered habitats is a positive side of its natural survival. Several nests may be built in the vicinity by pairs that form a loose colony. They forage in small groups especially in the non-breeding season. The clutch is four to six eggs.

Its voice song is high-pitched warble, ending with prolonged trill with weak seee and swee notes not unlike that of Turdoides subrufus.

Field surveys at Mount Abu conducted during 2004–2005 examined munia occurrence across different altitudinal zones and habitats, with particular attention to the Green Avadavat. Mehra, Sharma and Mathur reported the species from the Abu Hills and documented its occurrence in relation to altitude and habitat during the study period. Behavioural observations at the Abu Hills were also reported by Mehra and Mehra in a study of behavioural responses and environmental stress factors affecting Green Avadavat, based on field investigations in southern Rajasthan.

== Conservation and community protection ==
The green avadavat has been a popular cage bird and has been in the bird trade since the late 19th century. It continues to be common in some areas such as Oriya village, Achalgarh and Guru Shikhar in Mount Abu, Rajasthan, but has declined mainly due to trapping. In trade the bird is called the green waxbill. Entire flocks are easily trapped using bait and decoy birds. Awareness and protection of habitats at Mt Abu have helped the continued existence of some populations. At Mount Abu, conservation work has also included community participation. A socio-ecological model developed around the Green Avadavat involved local youth in monitoring potential sites and linked local ecological knowledge with conservation activities. The approach was subsequently presented as the “Abu Model”, connecting Green Avadavat habitat protection with nature tourism, nature guiding, birding and livelihood opportunities. A socio-ecological case study of Green Munia conservation was also presented at the Udaipur Bird Festival in 2020. The case study described habitat alteration, community participation and local conservation actions in southern Rajasthan.

A systematic study published in 2026 surveyed Green Avadavat distribution and habitat selection at Mount Abu Wildlife Sanctuary. Surveys conducted during March–August 2023 covered 129 1-km² squares, with the species detected in 40 squares. Occurrence was associated with higher elevations and greater grass and shrub cover, while sprawl and land-use change were identified as risks to suitable habitat. The study also noted that removal of invasive shrubs should be evaluated carefully because some shrub vegetation may provide cover for the species.
