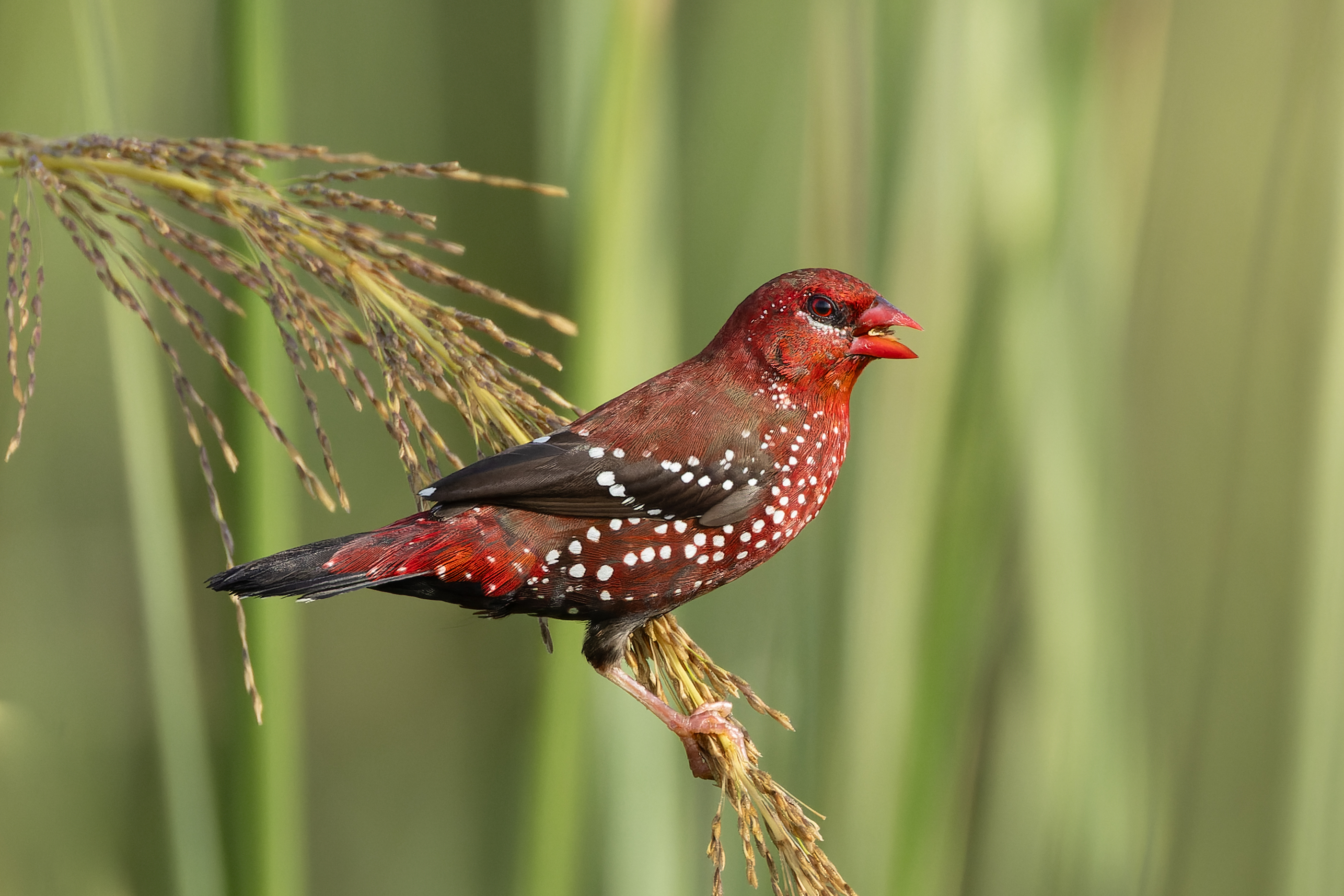
- Male
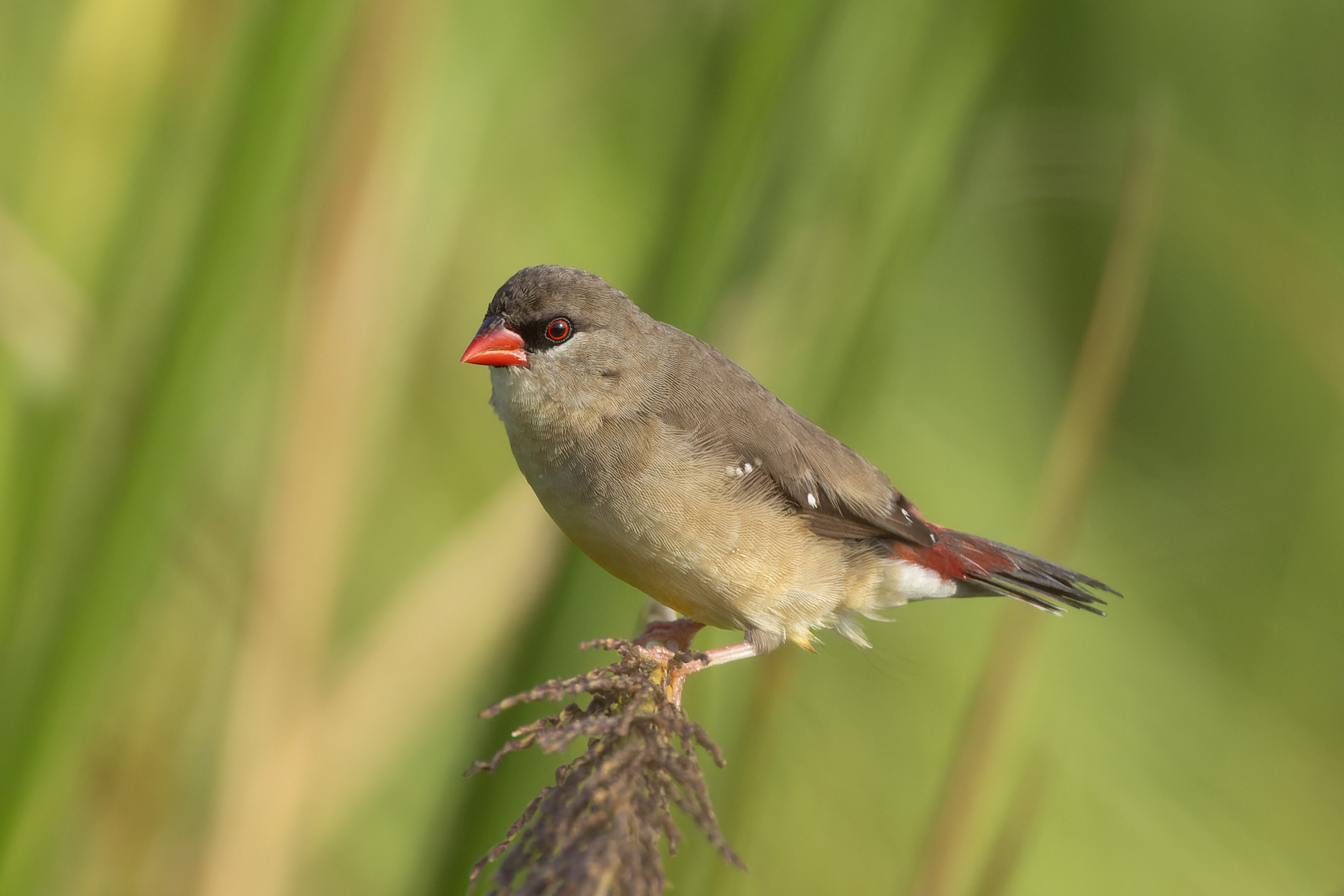
- Female Pair of A. amandava from West Bengal, India

Conservation status
- Least Concern (IUCN 3.1)

Scientific classification
- Kingdom: Animalia
- Phylum: Chordata
- Class: Aves
- Order: Passeriformes
- Family: Estrildidae
- Genus: Amandava
- Species: A. amandava

Binomial name
- Amandava amandava (Linnaeus, 1758)

Synonyms
- Fringilla amandava (Linnaeus, 1758); Estrilda amandava (Linnaeus, 1758); Sporaeginthus amandava (Linnaeus, 1758)

= Red avadavat =

Species of bird

Red avadavat (Amandava amandava), red munia or strawberry finch - sound

The red avadavat (Amandava amandava), red munia or strawberry finch, is a sparrow-sized bird of the family Estrildidae. It is found in the open fields and grasslands of tropical Asia and is popular as a cage bird due to the colourful plumage of the males in their breeding season. It breeds in the Indian subcontinent in the monsoon season. The species name of amandava and the common name of avadavat are derived from the city of Ahmedabad in Gujarat, India, from where these birds were exported into the pet trade in former times.

== Taxonomy ==
The red avadavat was formally described by the Swedish naturalist Carl Linnaeus in 1758 in the tenth edition of his Systema Naturae under the binomial name Fringilla amandava. Linnaeus based his description on "The Amaduvads Cock and Hen" that has been described and illustrated in 1738 by the English naturalist Eleazar Albin. Linnaeus specified the locality as East India but this was restricted to Kolkata (Calcutta) by E. C. Stuart Baker in 1921. This species is now placed in the genus Amandava that was introduced in 1836 by the English zoologist Edward Blyth.

The red avadavat was earlier included in the genus Estrilda by Jean Delacour. This placement was followed for a while but morphological, behavioural, biochemical and DNA studies now support their separation in the genus Amandava.

Three subspecies are recognised:

- A. a. amandava (Linnaeus, 1758) – Pakistan, India, Nepal and Bangladesh
- A. a. flavidiventris (Wallace, 1864) – Myanmar, south China, northwest, central Thailand and the Lesser Sundas
- A. a. punicea (Horsfield, 1821) – southeast Thailand, Cambodia, south Vietnam, Java and Bali

== Description ==
This small finch is easily identified by the rounded black tail and the bill that is seasonally red. The rump is red and the breeding male is red on most of the upper parts except for a black eye-stripe, lower belly and wings. There are white spots on the red body and wing feathers. The non-breeding male is duller but has the red-rump while the female is duller with less of the white spotting on the feathers.

== Distribution and habitat ==
Red avadavats are found mainly on flat plains, in places with tall grasses or crops, often near water. The species has four named subspecies. The nominate subspecies is called amandava and is found in Bangladesh, India, Nepal and Pakistan; the Burmese form is called flavidiventris (also found in parts of China, Indonesia, Thailand and Vietnam); the population further east in Java is called punicea and in Cambodia, decouxi.

Introduced populations exist in several locations worldwide: southern Spain, Brunei, Fiji, Egypt, Malaysia, the United States, Bahrain, Guadeloupe, Iran, Italy, Réunion, Mexico, the Dominican Republic, Martinique, Portugal, Japan, Puerto Rico, Singapore and Hawaii.

== Behaviour and ecology ==
This finch is usually seen in small flocks, flying with rapid wingbeats and descending into grass clumps where they are hard to observe. Pairs stay together during the breeding season. These birds produce a distinctive low single note pseep call that is often given in flight. The song is a series of low notes. Birds of a flock will preen each other, ruffling their head feathers in invitation. They feed mainly on grass seeds but will also take insects such as termites when they are available.

They build a globular nest made of grass blades. The usual clutch is about five or six white eggs.

The beak begins to turn red in May and darkens during November and December. The beak then turns rapidly to black in April and the cycle continues. These seasonal cycles are linked to seasonal changes in daylength.

Two ectoparasitic species of bird lice (an ischnoceran, Brueelia amandavae, and an amblyceran, Myrsidea amandava) have been identified living on them and a paramyxovirus has been isolated from birds kept in Japan.

== Conservation ==
Though the current conservation status of Red avadavat is Least Concern (LC), it has become increasingly uncommon in at least part of Southeast Asia. In Thailand, they are described an uncommon to rare resident. In Cambodia, Red avadavats were already "exported by the thousands" to Vietnam in the 1920s, described as "uncommon and irregular" in the early 1960s, and populations are now considered to be low and of concern, yet significant numbers were still found in the merit release trade in 2012.

== Gallery ==
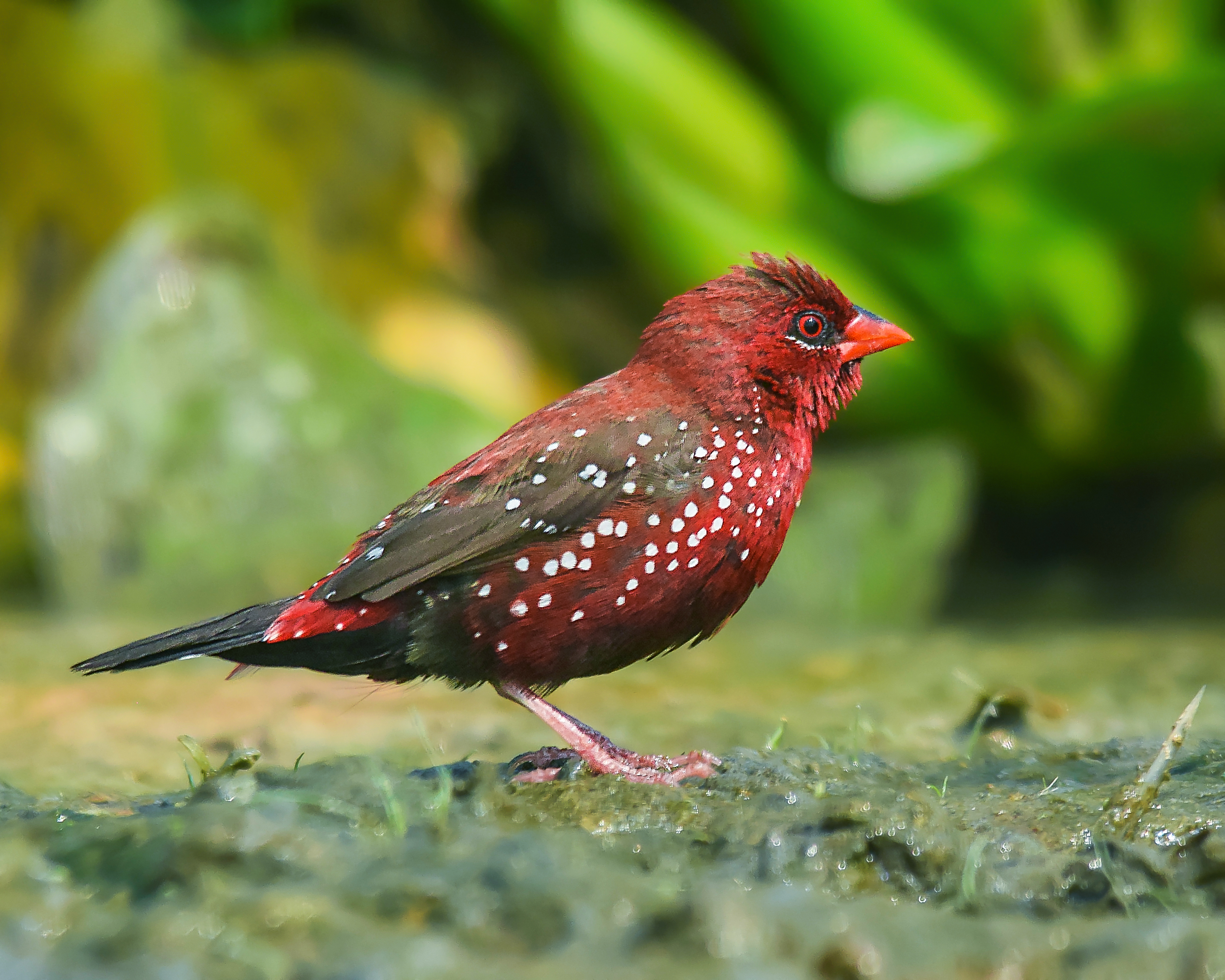
Red avadavat (male) from Dhaka, Bangladesh

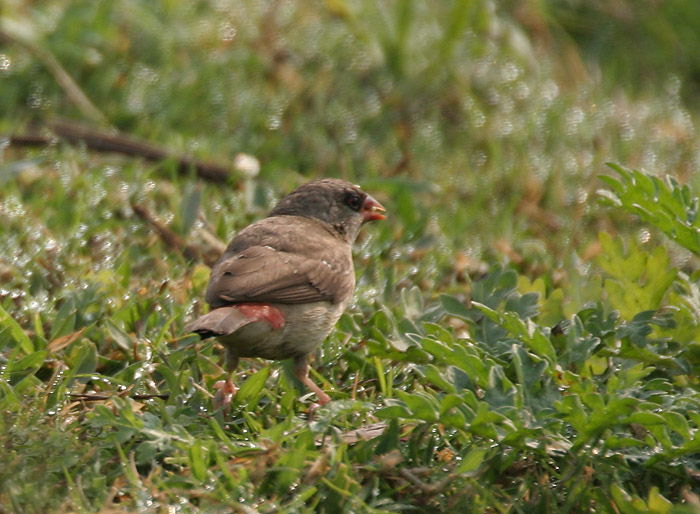
Female with red rump visible

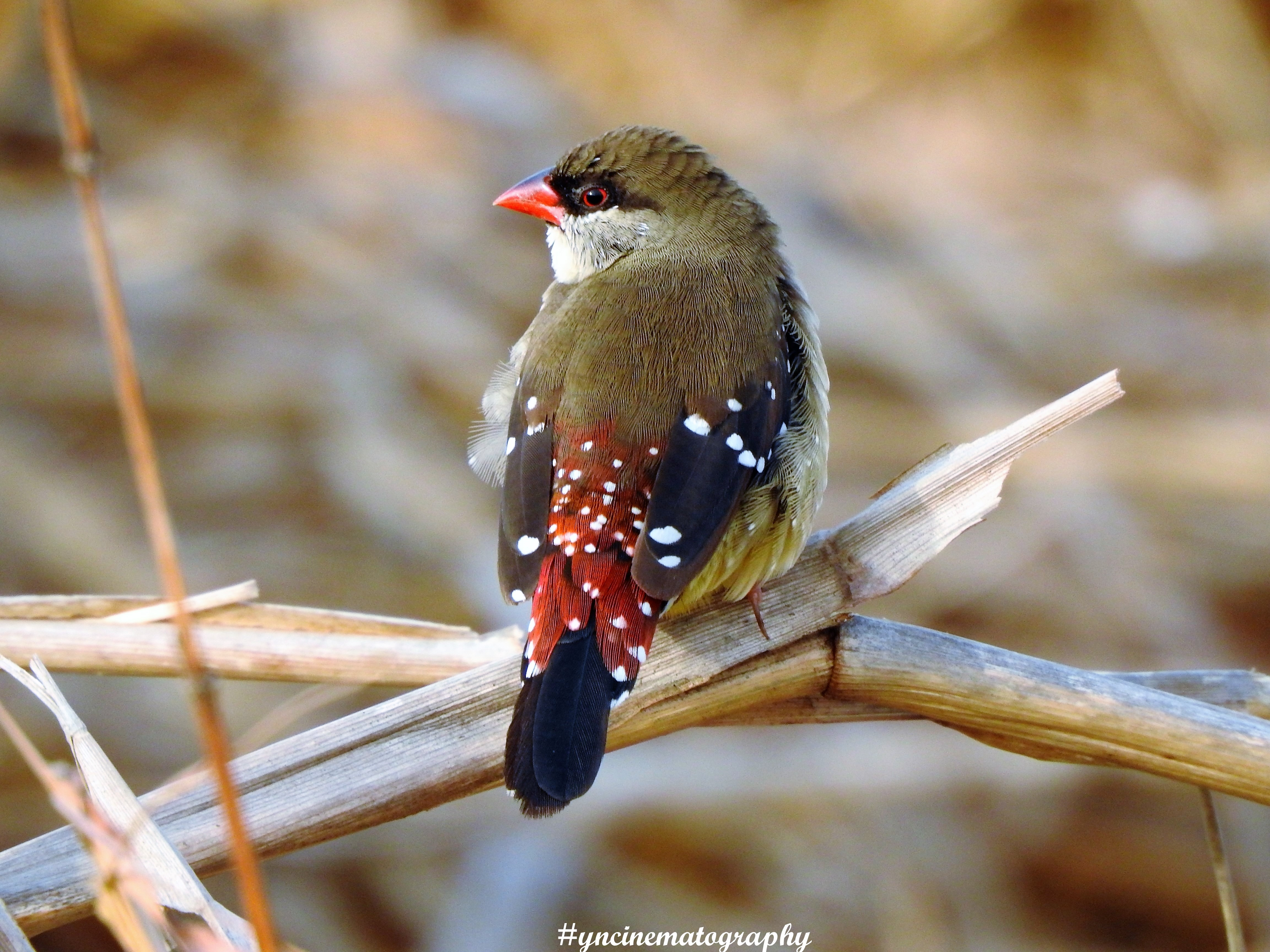
Male in non-breeding plumage

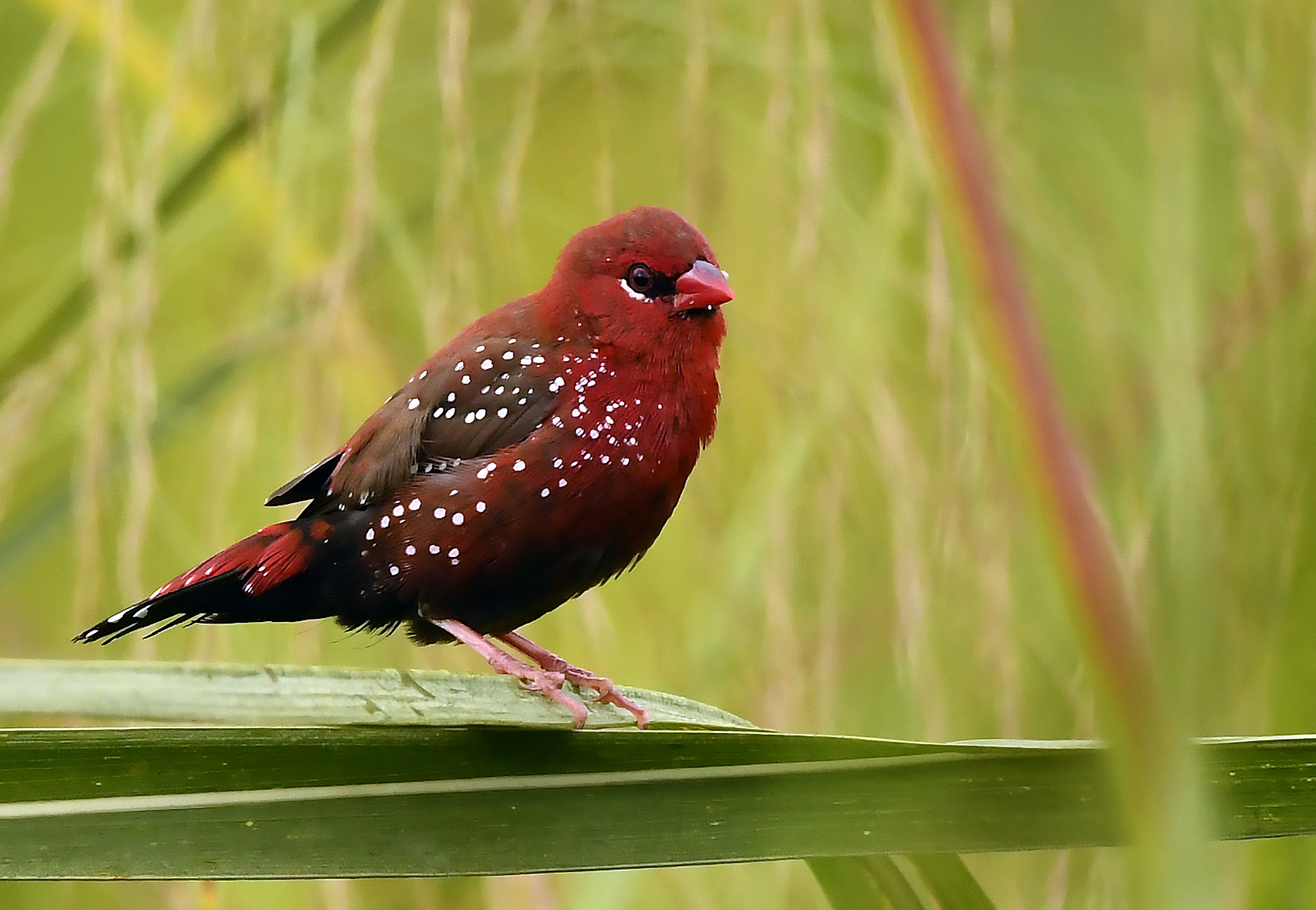
Male Amandava amandava amandava in breeding plumage

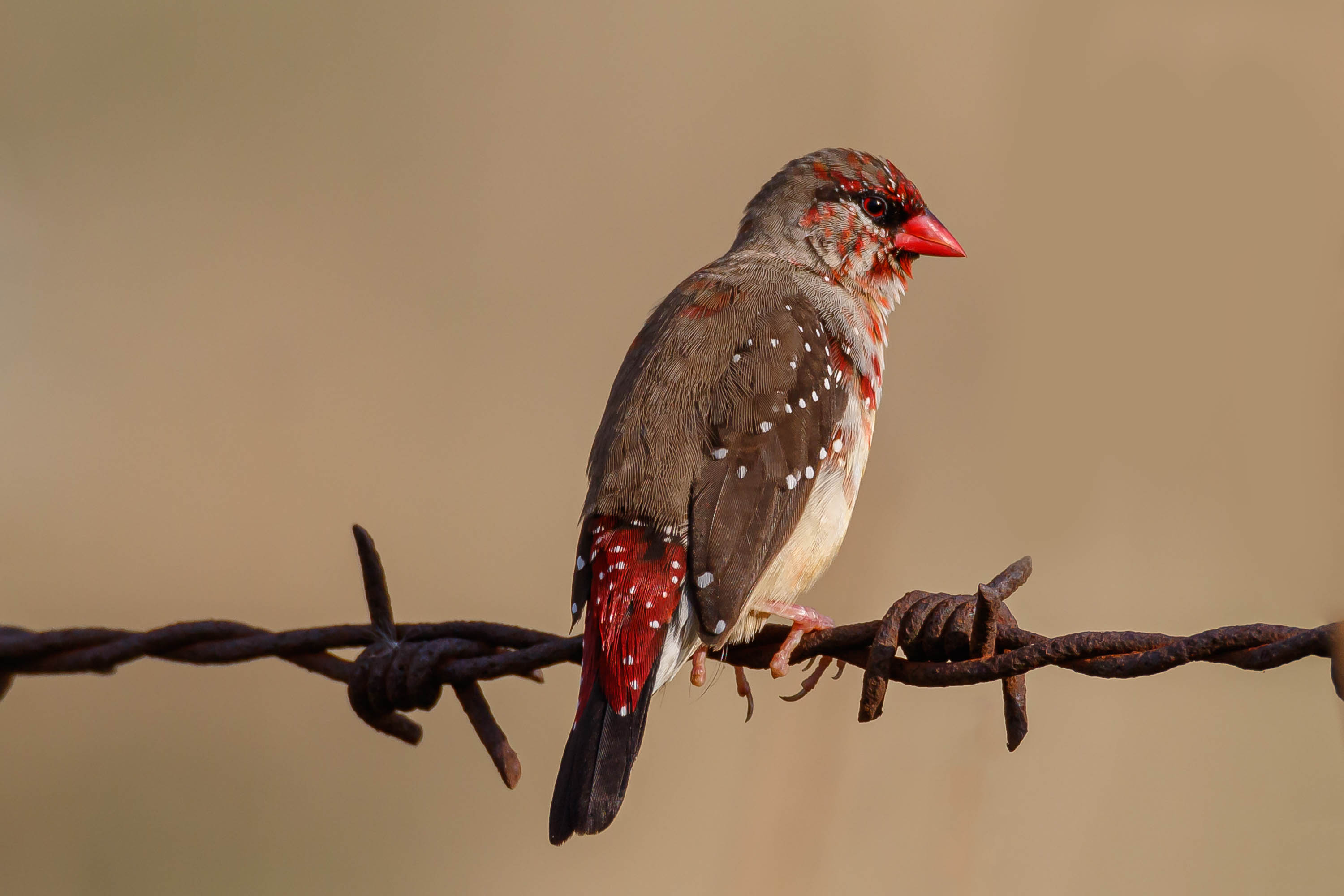

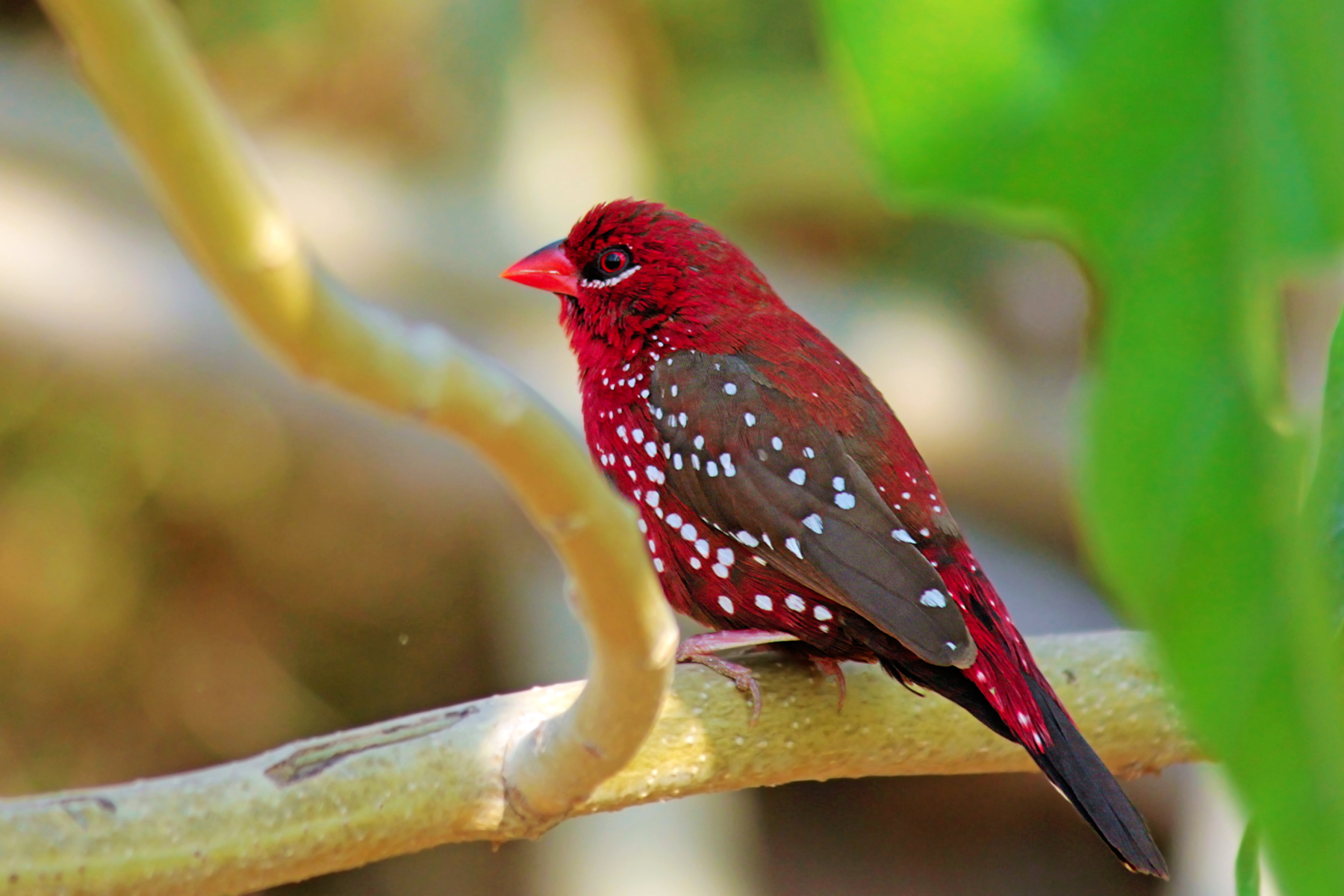

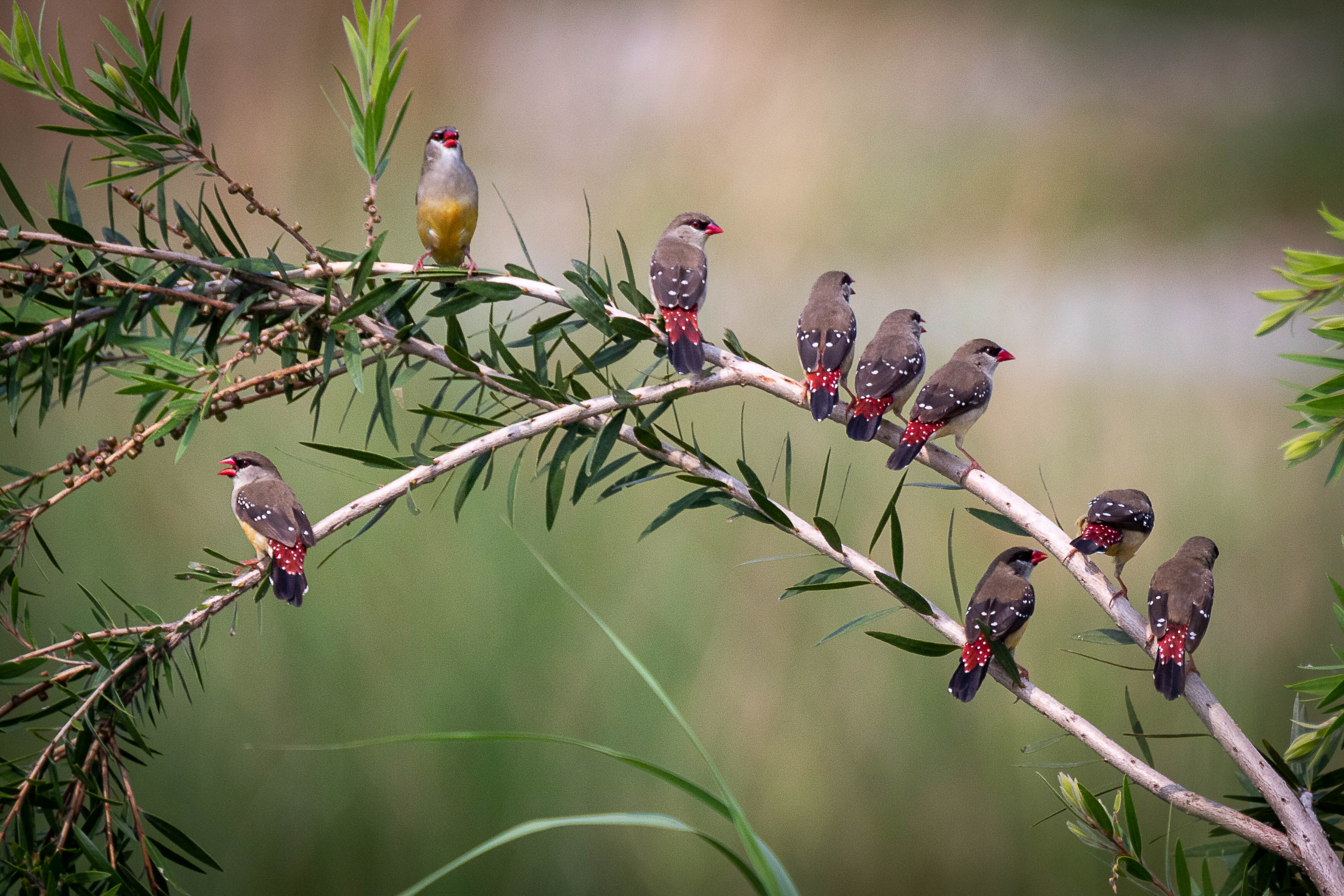
Red avadavat female in its habitat

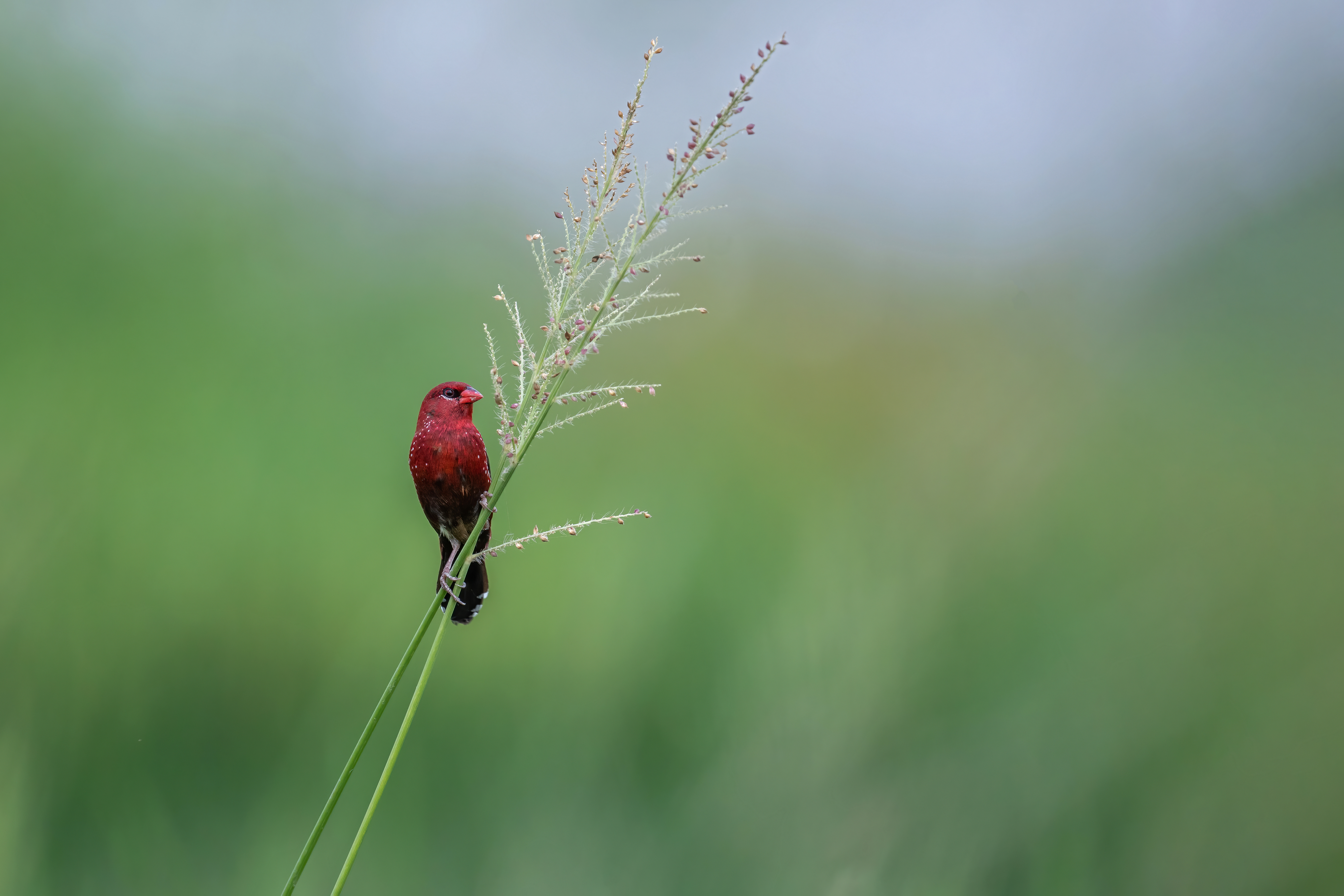
Red avadavat amandava (male) in marshland habitat
