= Ann Lee (illustrator) =

British artist (1753–1790)

- Born: 1753
- Died: 1790 (aged 36–37)
- Known for: Botanical illustrations

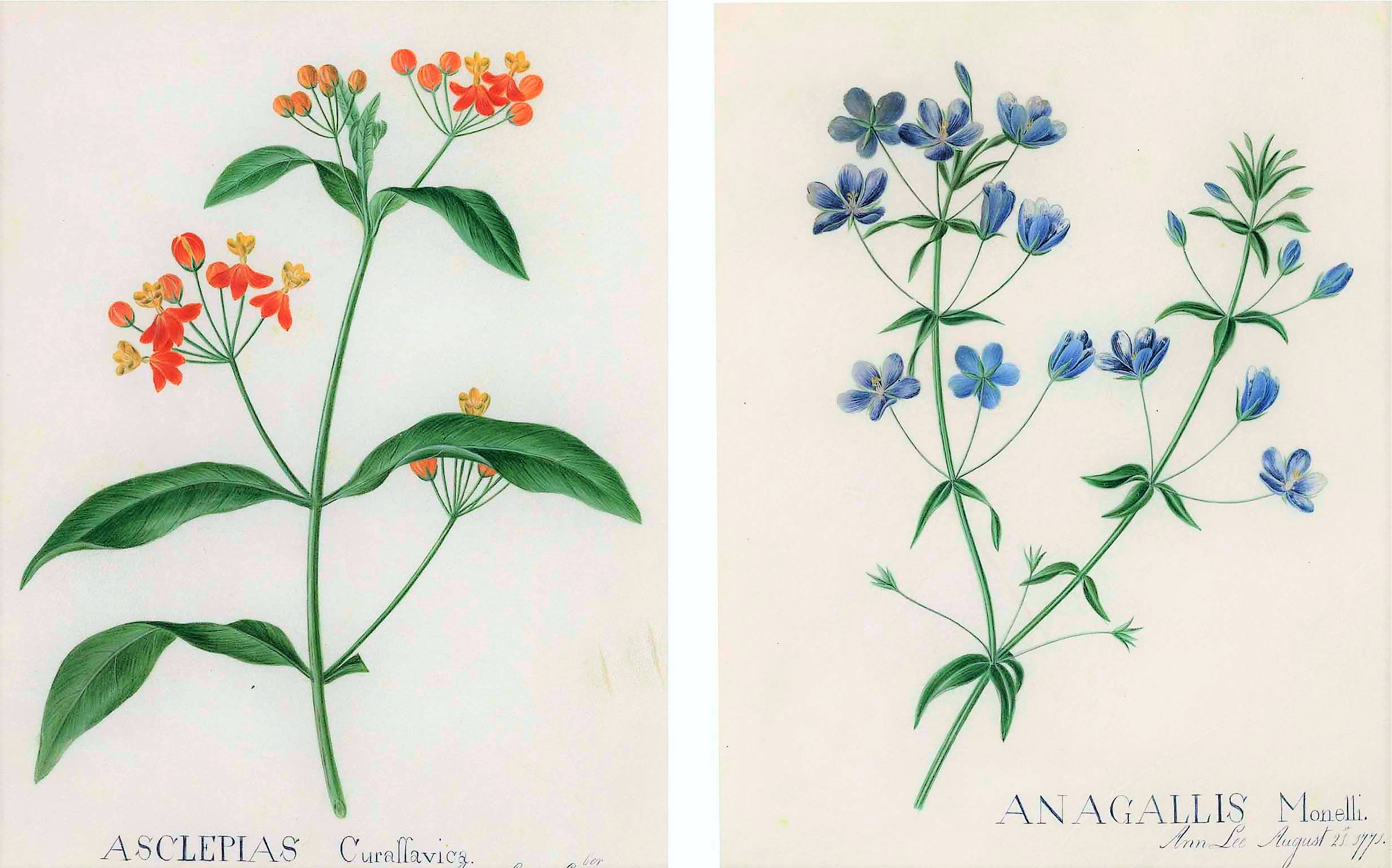
Anne Lee drawings of Asclepias curassavica, Anagallis monelli, 1771

Ann Lee (1753 – 1790) was a British botanical illustrator who also illustrated birds and insects.

== Life ==
Lee was the youngest daughter of James Lee, a Scottish nurseryman trading in Hammersmith, London, who is described in one source as "the botanist John Lee". She was a pupil of artist and illustrator Sydney Parkinson (1745–1771) until his early death at sea in the employment of Joseph Banks. In Parkinson's will he left "whatever utensils that are useful in painting or drawing to Mr. Lee's daughter, my scholar." In 2012 these "utensils" were reported to be in the collection of the National Library of Australia.

Her father was in correspondence with Carl Linnaeus during the 1770s and he would send his daughter's drawings to him to illustrate a point. He offered to send some of her work to him on loan or to view because of its value.

Lee was commissioned by John Fothergill to draw plants from his garden and insects and shells from his museum. After Fothergill's death his collection, including Lee's drawings, was sold to Catherine the Great. Lee made copies of her drawings before they were sent to St Petersburg.

== Death and legacy ==
Lee pre-deceased her father. She was buried in Hammersmith in 1790 aged 37.

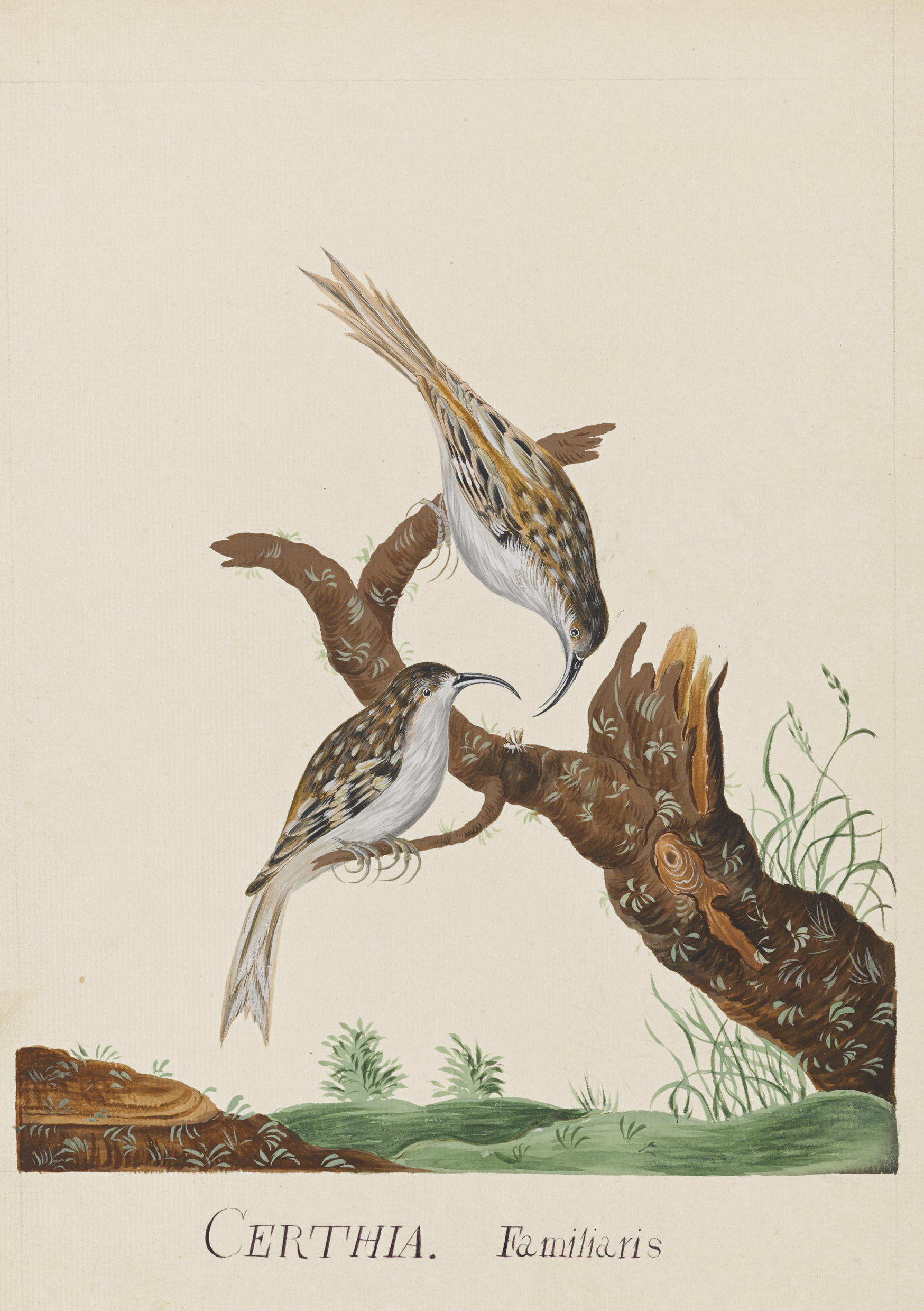
Certhia familiaris Linnaeus Eurasian treecreeper- Ann Lee - 107-1973-26

The Royal Botanic Gardens, Kew holds the Ann Lee Collection, presented to Kew in 1969. This comprises 165 illustrations of which some two thirds are attributed to Lee, the remaining 60 being on Chinese paper and believed to be by Chinese artists, thought to have been collected by her father in connection with his work supplying exotic plants to the gardens. Her works held by Kew were included in a major project with the Oak Spring Garden Foundation to digitise the work of women botanical illustrators. The Royal Albert Memorial Museum in Exeter holds a collection of 79 of her drawings of butterflies, birds and insects donated by her descendent Marjorie Lee. A group of seven of her botanical illustrations, dated in 1771 when she was aged 17 or 18, sold for £3,125 at Christie's auction house in 2013.

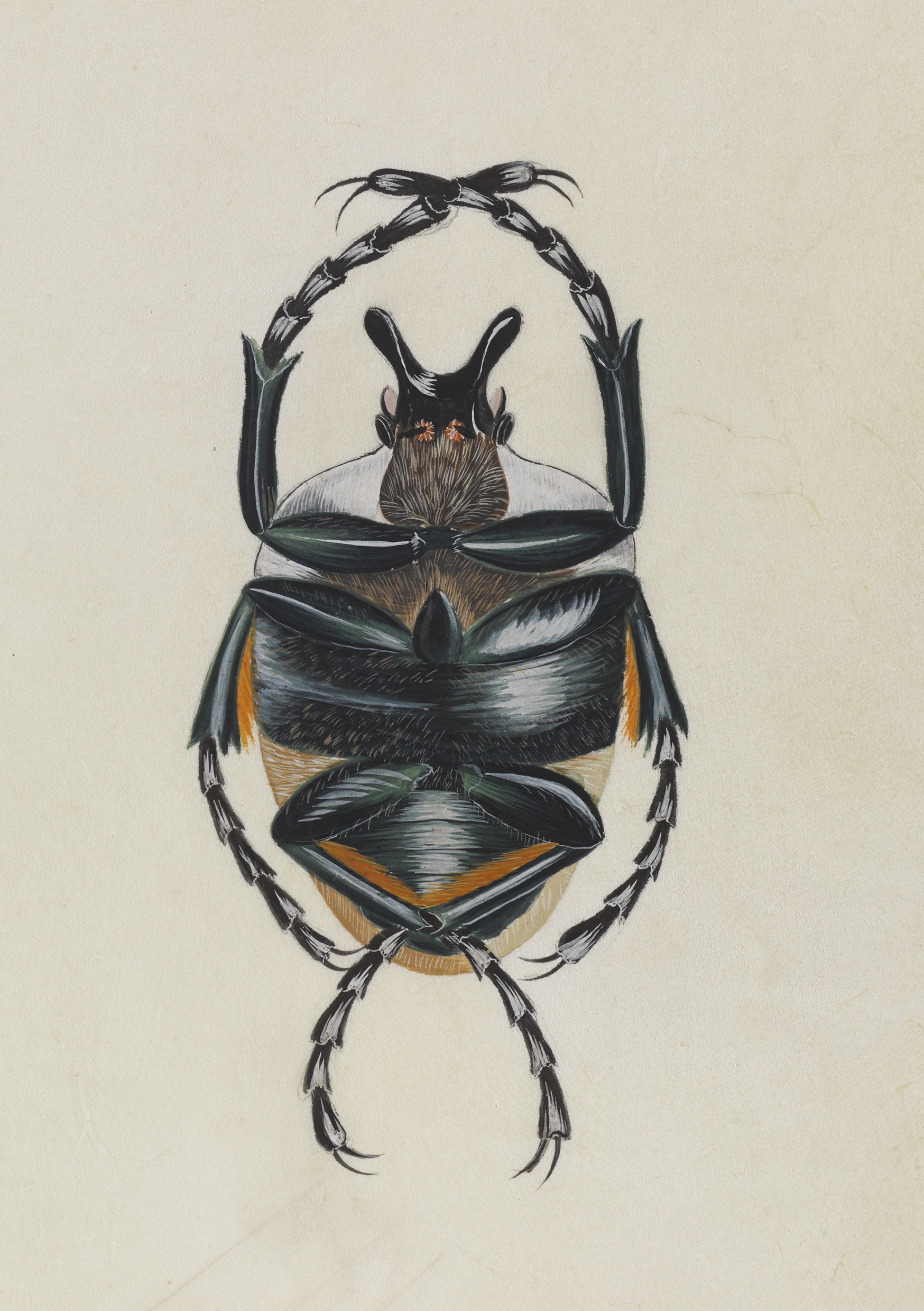
Goliath Beetle (the underside of) by Ann Lee

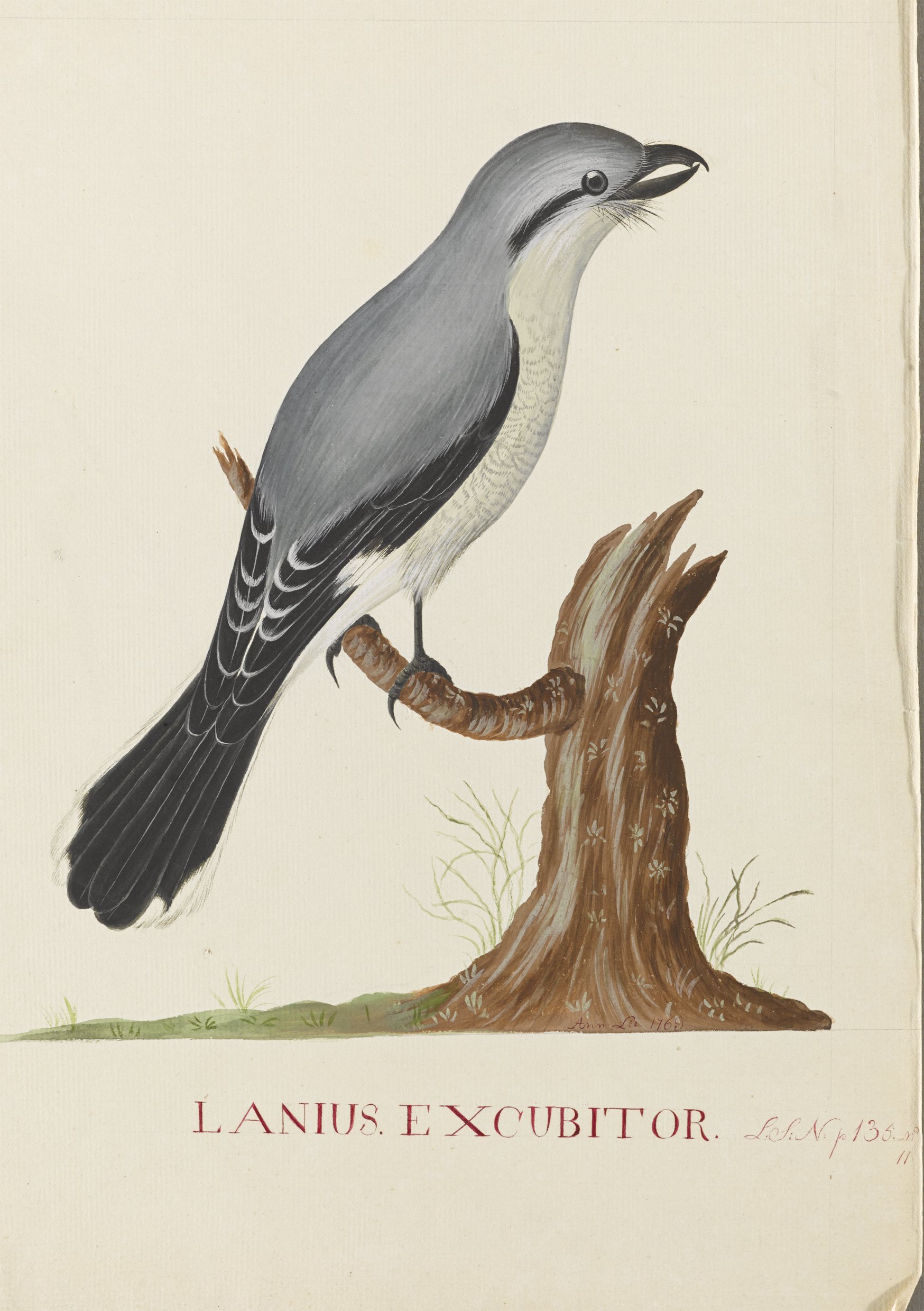
Lanius excubitor Linnaeus: great grey shrike by Ann Lee

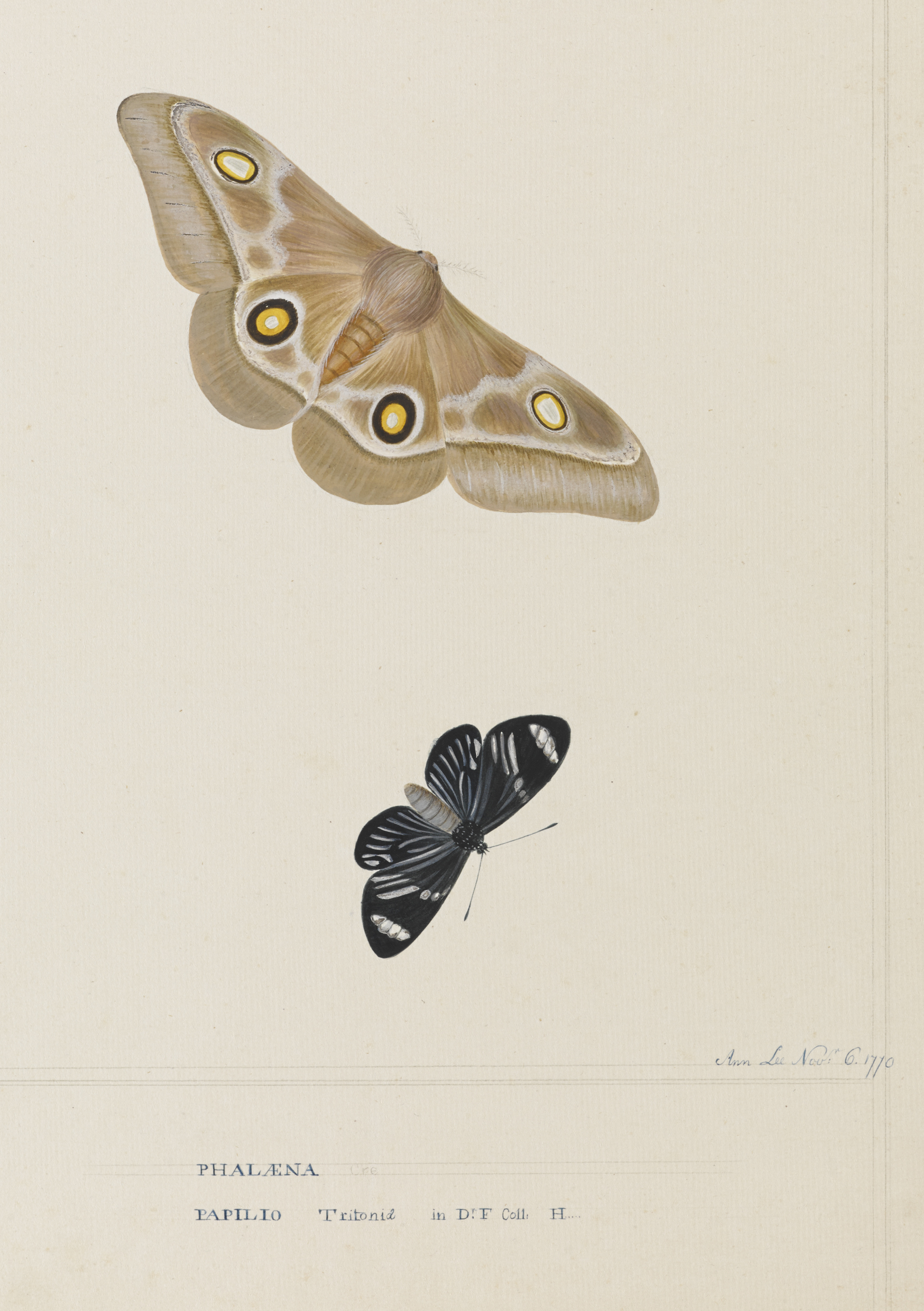
Phalaena and Papilio Tritonia by Ann Lee

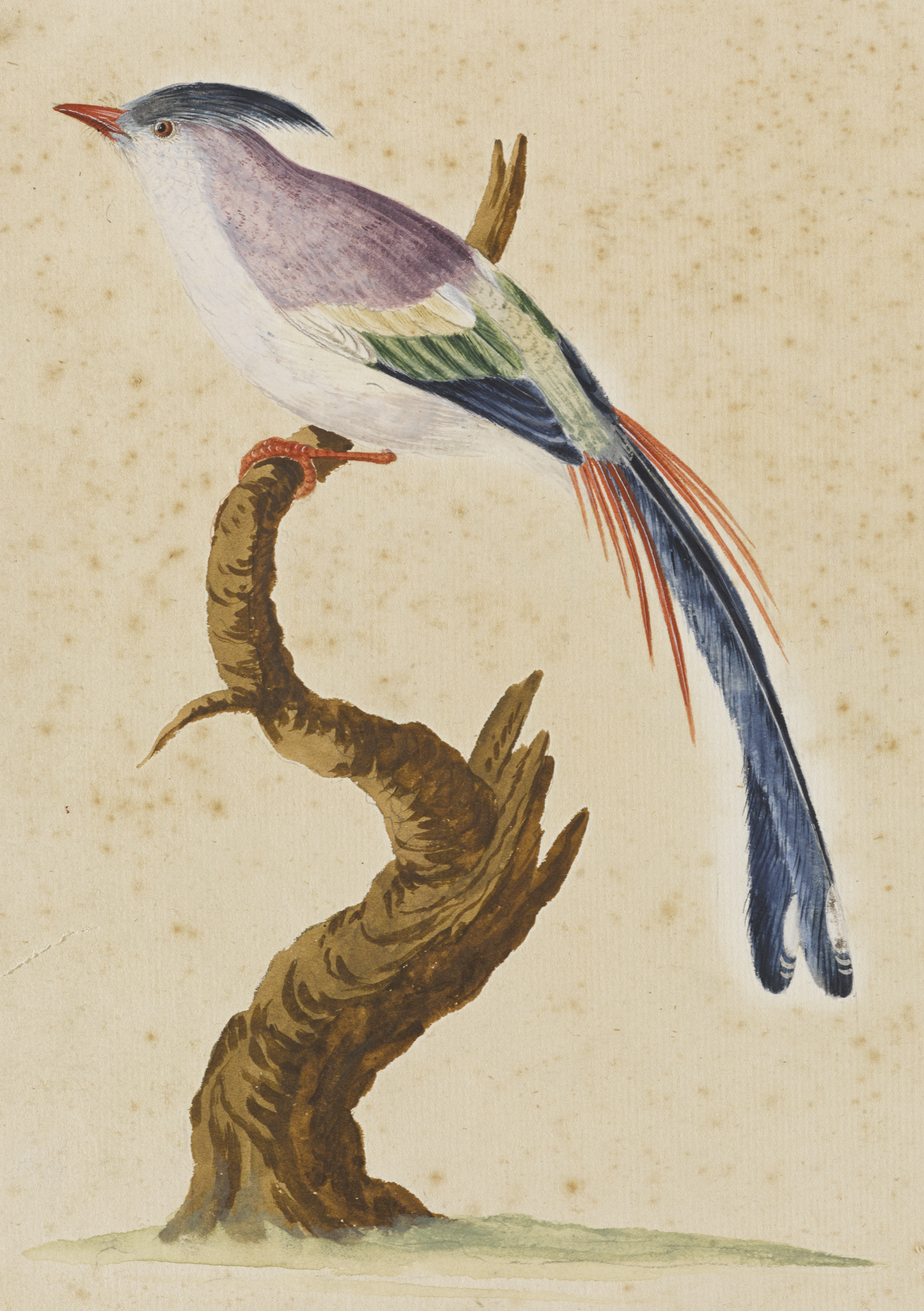
Study of a bird by Ann Lee
