= Alexander Buchan (artist) =

Scottish landscape artist

- Oil painting showing Alexander Buchan, possibly a self portrait
- Died: 17 April 1769; Matavai Bay, Tahiti
- Known for: Landscape and ethnographic art from the first voyage of James Cook
- Patrons: Joseph Banks

Alexander Buchan (died 17 April 1769) was a Scottish landscape artist. He is known for his participation in the 1768–1771 first voyage of James Cook aboard HMS Endeavour, where he was one of the artists in the entourage of botanist Joseph Banks. Buchan had epilepsy. On the journey, he had two documented seizures, the first during an expedition in Tierra del Fuego. Buchan died after the second seizure, shortly after Endeavour's arrival at Tahiti, and was buried at sea. Buchan produced landscapes, coastal views, ethnographic drawings and natural history drawings. He is best known for illustrations of the people of Tierra del Fuego, some of which were engraved for publication in accounts of the voyage. All of his drawings from the voyage were taken by his employer Joseph Banks and are now in the British Library and the Natural History Museum, London.

== Background ==
Nothing is known about the early life of Buchan, but he was described as having been "young" when he was hired by Joseph Banks to go on the first voyage of James Cook. According to Averil Lysaght, an expert on Banks, there is no evidence that Buchan exhibited work in London, but Banks, who had many Scottish contacts, could have heard about Buchan's ethnographically precise and unromantic work through one of them. However, Lysaght found no direct evidence for a connection of Buchan with either Banks' Scottish friends or with the Buchan family of North Berwick, Scotland. It is unclear whether Banks knew that Buchan was an epileptic before the start of his employment. It is also not known how Buchan learned to draw. According to the art historian Bernard Smith, Buchan was not academically trained in figure drawing, but had likely learned through self-study by making copies of engravings. An oil painting showing Buchan exists, which in 1979 was in the possession of Christopher Crowder. It has been proposed that it is a self portrait, which would make it the artist's only known work before the voyage on the Endeavour.

== Voyage with Captain Cook ==
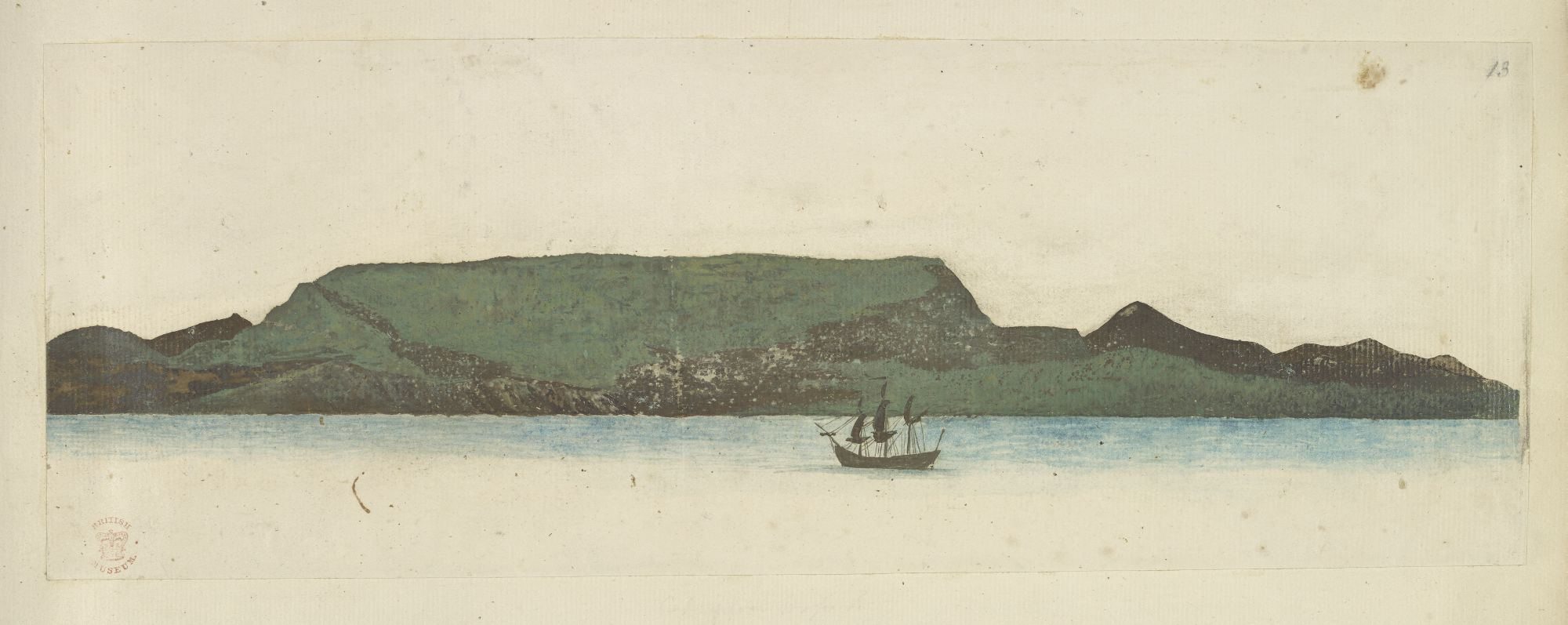
HMS Endeavour on 12 January 1769, off the coast of Tierra del Fuego, gouache by Alexander Buchan

On the first voyage of James Cook, the naturalist Joseph Banks was accompanied by a party of eight people, including the two artists Sydney Parkinson and Alexander Buchan, with the latter engaged for landscape and figure drawing. Banks' original plan was to have Parkinson draw faithful representations of plants and animals, and to have Buchan draw the scenery and natives. Both Parkinson and Buchan also drew coastal profiles, possibly on Cook's suggestion. Such views of the coast were often used as navigational aids and included in charts. It is possible that Cook himself instructed Buchan and Herman Spöring Jr., Banks' scientific secretary, in the drawing of views, as the work of both has similarities to Cook's own coastal views. Banks' associates produced work that was more accurate than the usual standard of the Royal Navy.

Buchan is not mentioned often in the surviving journals from the voyage. In Banks' journals, his first appearance is a note that Buchan drew views of the Cape Verde islands on 30 September 1768. Buchan's epilepsy first comes up in Banks' journal during an expedition in Tierra del Fuego. Endeavour lay at anchor in the Bay of Good Success on 15 January 1769. On 16 January, a group of eleven people including Banks, Daniel Solander, Buchan and four of Banks' servants went on an expedition in the country, attempting to reach the top of the hills. During this, Buchan had an epileptic seizure, a fire was lit, and the servants stayed with Buchan while Banks and others went on to search for alpine plants. On their return, the weather became cold and it started to snow, making it impossible to return to the ship. Two of Banks' servants, Richmond and Dorlton, got drunk on whiskey and died from exposure that night, but Buchan recovered.

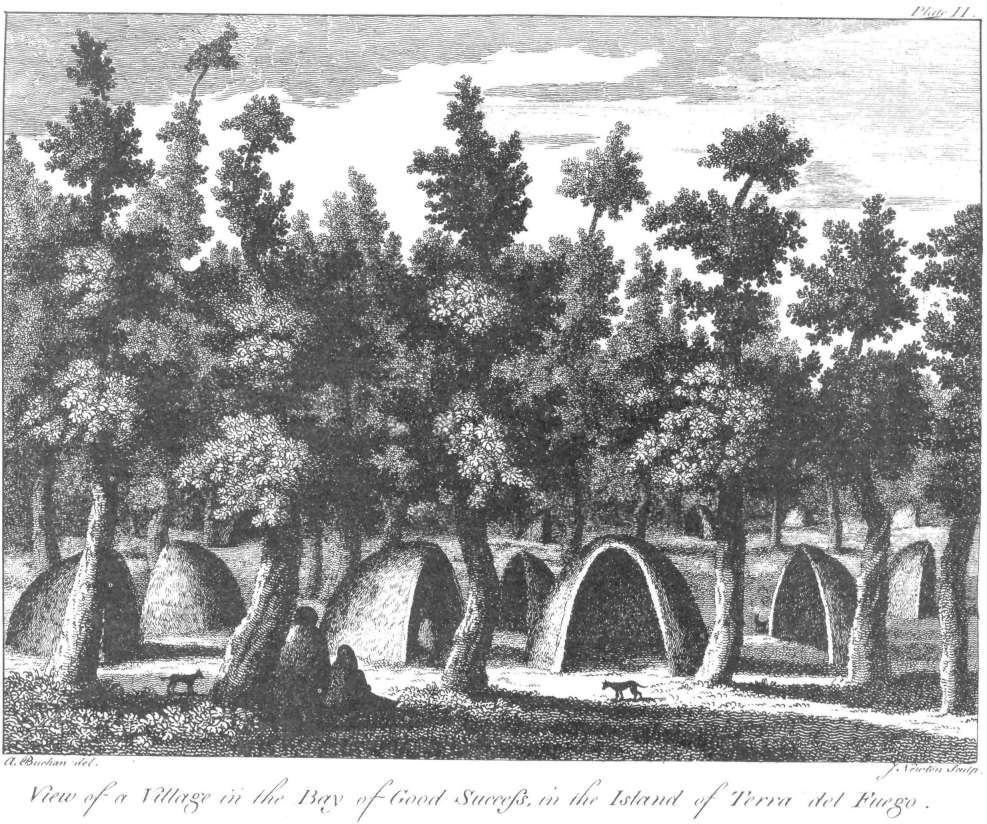
View of a Village in the Bay of Good Success, in the Island of Terra del Fuego, engraving by James Newton after Alexander Buchan. From Sydney Parkinson's posthumous Journal of a Voyage to the South Seas, 1773

On 20 January, Banks visited an Ona village, very likely together with Buchan, whose drawing of An Indian Town at Terra del Fuego (engraved as View of a Village in the Bay of Good Success, in the Island of Terra del Fuego) illustrates Banks' description:

The town itself was situate upon a dry Knowl among the trees, which were not at all cleard away, it consisted of not more than twelve or fourteen huts or wigwams of the most unartificial construction imaginable, indeed no thing bearing the name of a hut could possibly be built with less trouble. They consisted of a few poles set up and meeting together at the top in a conical figure, these were covered on the weather side with a few boughs and a little grass, on the lee side about one eighth part of the circle was left open and against this opening was a fire made.

== Death at Tahiti ==
From Tierra del Fuego, the Endeavour continued to Tahiti in order to observe the 1769 transit of Venus, arriving at the island on 13 April. Banks recorded in his journal for 16 April 1769 that Buchan had an epileptic seizure: "Poor Mr Buchan the young man who I brought out as lanscape [sic] and figure painter was yesterday attackd by an epileptick fit [sic] , he was today quite insensible, our surgeon gives me very little hopes of him." He died at Matavai Bay on 17 April 1769. James Cook wrote in his journal:

At 2 oClock this Morning departed this Life Mr Alex Buchan Landscip Draftsman to Mr Banks, a Gentleman well skill'd in his profession and one that will be greatly miss'd in the course of this Voyage, he had long been subject to a disorder in his Bowels which had more than once brought him to the Very point of death and was at the same time subject to fits of one of which he was taken on Saturday morning, this brought on his former disorder which brought a period to his life.

This was the first mention of Buchan in Cook's journals. In a first draft of Cook's journal, he also stated about Buchan, "there are now none on board who understands this sort of drawing." On Banks' suggestion, Buchan's body was buried at sea as not to disturb the natives. Banks wrote of his employee's death:

I sincerely regret him as an ingenious and good young man, but his Loss to me is irretrevable, my airy dreams of entertaining my freinds in England with the scenes that I am to see here are vanishd. No account of the figures and dresses of men can be satisfactory unless illustrated with figures: had providence spard him a month longer what an advantage would it have been to my undertaking but I must submit.

After Buchan's death, his duties in drawing people and landscapes fell to Parkinson and Spöring.

== Artworks and legacy ==
Following Buchan's death, Banks took possession of all his drawings from the voyage. Buchan's natural history drawings are now in the British Natural History Museum, and include some drawings in pen and watercolour of marine animals from the coast of Brazil, as well as a cockroach from Madeira. The remaining material has been held by the British Library, since 1827, when Robert Brown transferred the library of Joseph Banks to the British Museum.

Buchan's best-known works are his illustrations of the people of western Tierra del Fuego, made during a stopover at the Bay of Success. For publication in John Hawkesworth's An Account of the Voyages (1773), Buchan's sketches were changed extensively by Giovanni Battista Cipriani to conform with Hawkesworth's interpretation of the Fuegians. Cipriani added additional figures to Buchan's Inhabitants of the island of Tierra del Fuego, in their hut before the images were engraved by Francesco Bartolozzi. Cipriani and Bartolozzi both had a classical education as history painters trained at the Accademia di Belle Arti di Firenze, and Cipriani used classical motifs to change the "wretched" inhabitants of the hut in Buchan's sketch into "comely youth and wise old men". However, the exposed genitals of the men in the image accurately follow both the description by Banks and Buchan's original. Another one of Buchan's drawings, of a village on Tierra del Fuego, was obtained by Sydney Parkinson's brother Stanfield from Banks, engraved by James Newton and published in Parkinson's Journal of a Voyage to the South Seas.

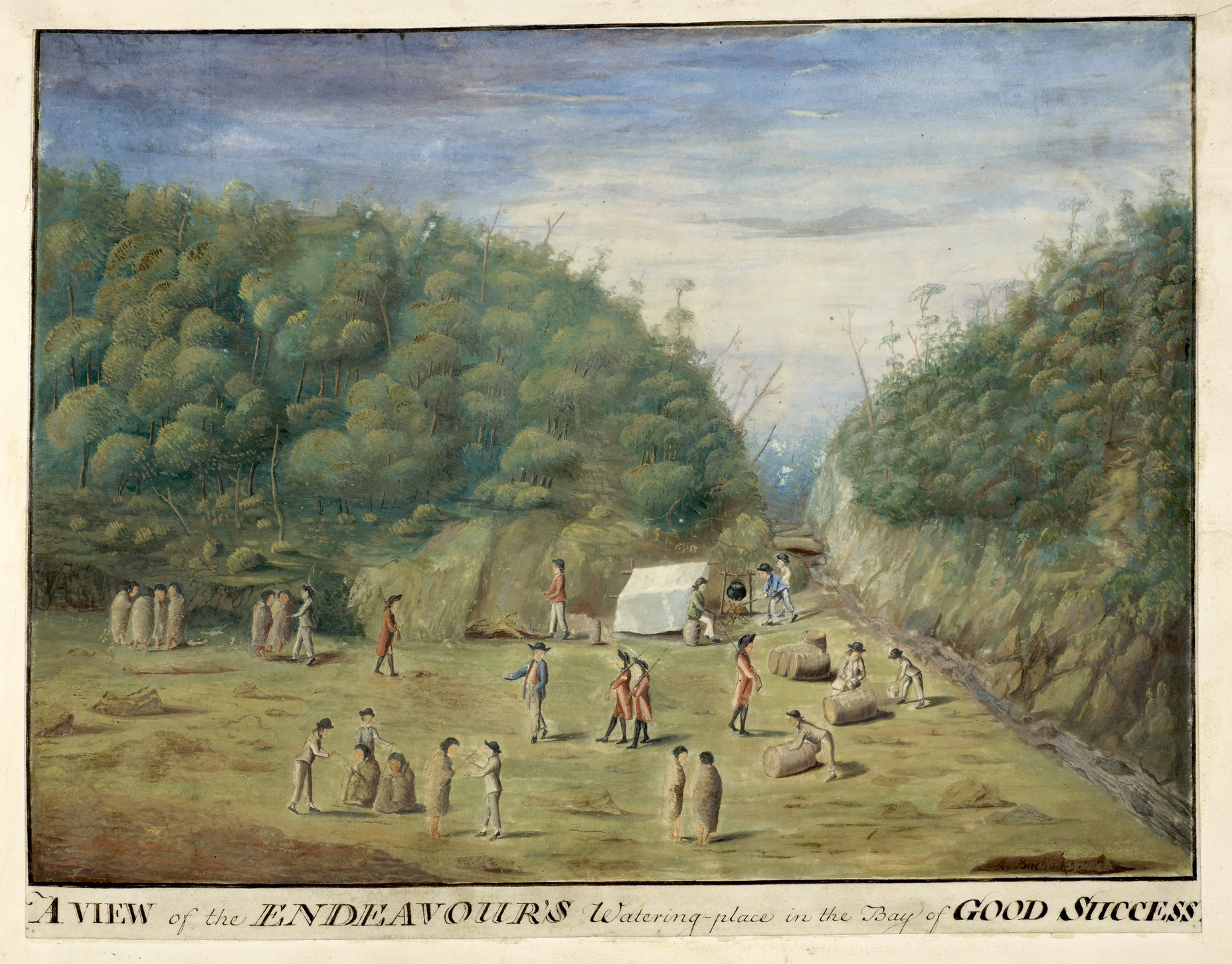
A view of the Endeavour's watering place in the Bay of Good Success, January 1769

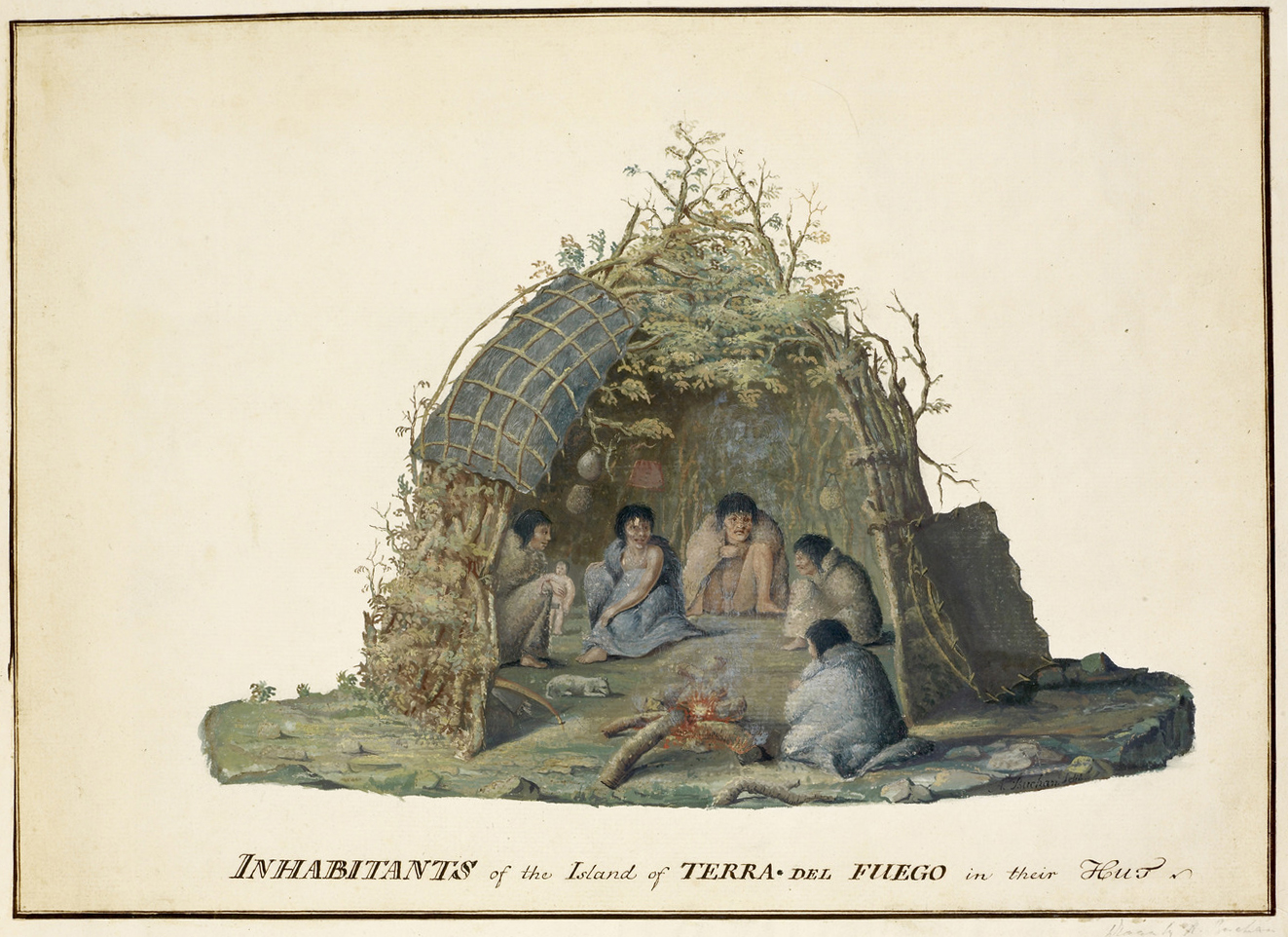
Inhabitants of the island of Tierra del Fuego, in their hut, January 1769

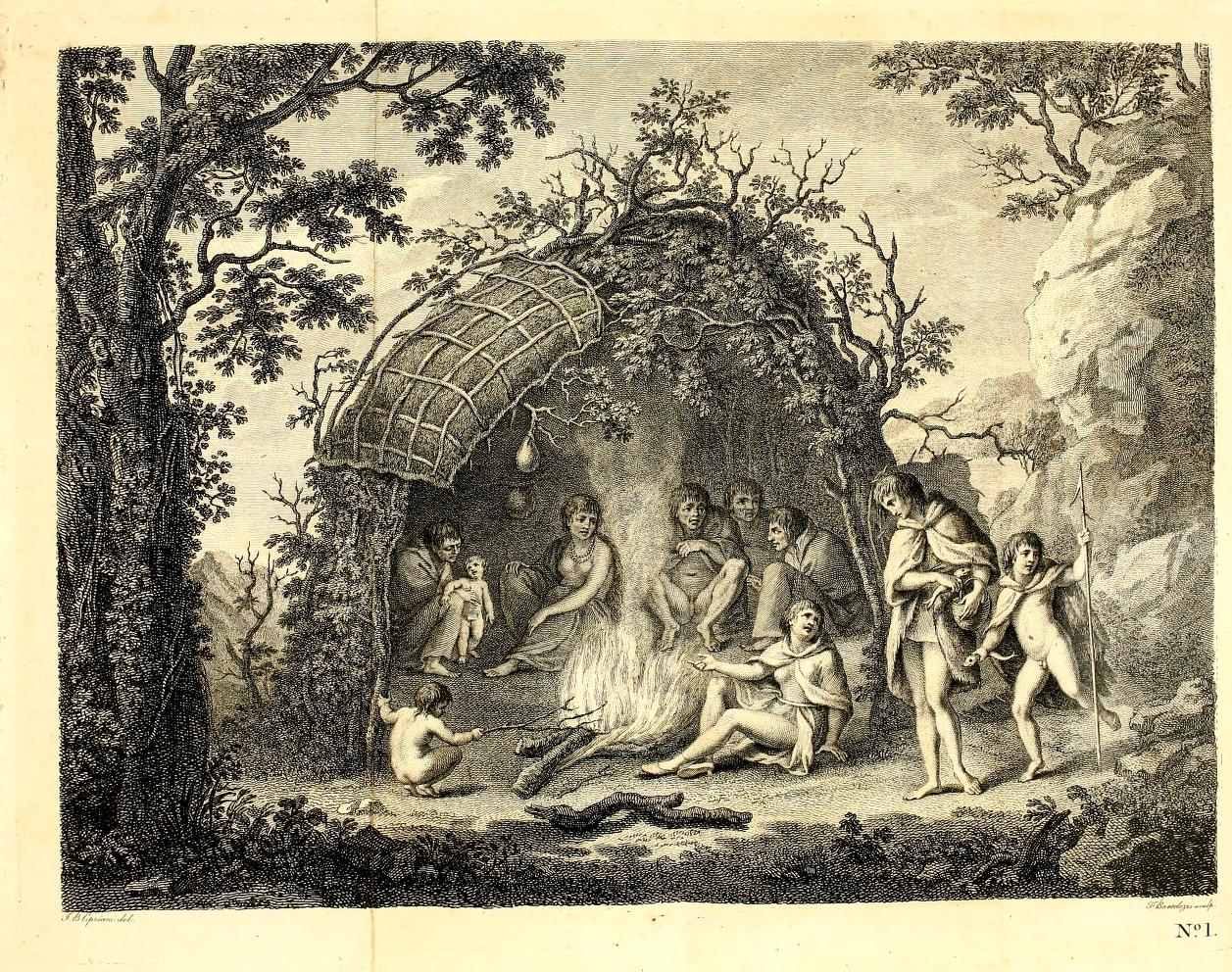
A View of the Indians of Tierra del Fuego in their hut, engraving by Francesco Bartolozzi after a drawing by Giovanni Battista Cipriani

== Sources ==
- Beaglehole, John C. (1962). The Endeavour journal of Joseph Banks 1768-1771. Sydney: Trustees of Public Library of N.S.W. in association with Angus and Robertson. OCLC 222980498.
- Beaglehole, John C. (1968) [1955]. The Journals of Captain James Cook: The Voyage of the Endeavour, 1768–1771. Cambridge: Cambridge University Press: Hakluyt Society. OCLC 223185477.
- Beaglehole, John C. (1974). The life of Captain James Cook. London: Adam & Charles Black. OCLC 480115019.
- David, Andrew (1988). The charts and coastal views of Captain Cook's voyages 1. The voyage of the Endeavour 1768-1771. London: Hakluyt Society. ISBN 978-0-904180-23-7. OCLC 165437019.
- Joppien, Rüdiger; Smith, Bernard (1985). The Art of Captain Cook's Voyages. Vol. One. The Voyage of the Endeavour 1768–1771. New Haven and London: Published for the Paul Mellon Centre for Studies in British Art by Yale University Press. ISBN 0-300-03450-4. OCLC 12544694.
- Lotzof, Kerry (17 August 2018). "HMS Endeavour 250". www.nhm.ac.uk.
- Lysaght, Averil M. (1979). "Banks's artists and his Endeavour collections". In Mitchell, T. C. (ed.). Captain Cook and the South Pacific. British Museum Yearbook. Vol. 3. London: British Museum Publications Ltd. pp. 9–80. ISBN 978-0-7141-0088-3.
- Smith, Bernard (1979). "Art as Information: Reflections on the Art from Captain Cook's Voyages" (PDF). Proceedings: The Australian Academy of the Humanities. 10: 82–126. OCLC 1230757596.
- Smith, Bernard (1985). European vision and the South Pacific. New Haven: Yale University Press. ISBN 978-0-300-02815-7.
- Smith, Bernard (1992). Imagining the Pacific: in the wake of the Cook voyages. New Haven: Yale University Press. ISBN 978-0-300-05053-0.
- Turnbull, Paul (5 May 2004). "Buchan, Alexander (? – 1769)". South Seas Companion. National Library of Australia. Archived from the original on 24 September 2009.
