= Agasias =

Agasias was the name of several people in classical history, including two Greek sculptors.

- Agasias of Arcadia, a warrior mentioned by Xenophon
- Agasias, son of Dositheus, Ephesian sculptor of the Borghese Gladiator
- Agasias, son of Menophilus (fl. probably c. 100 BC), Ephesian sculptor
