= An Account of the Voyages =

1773 book by John Hawkesworth

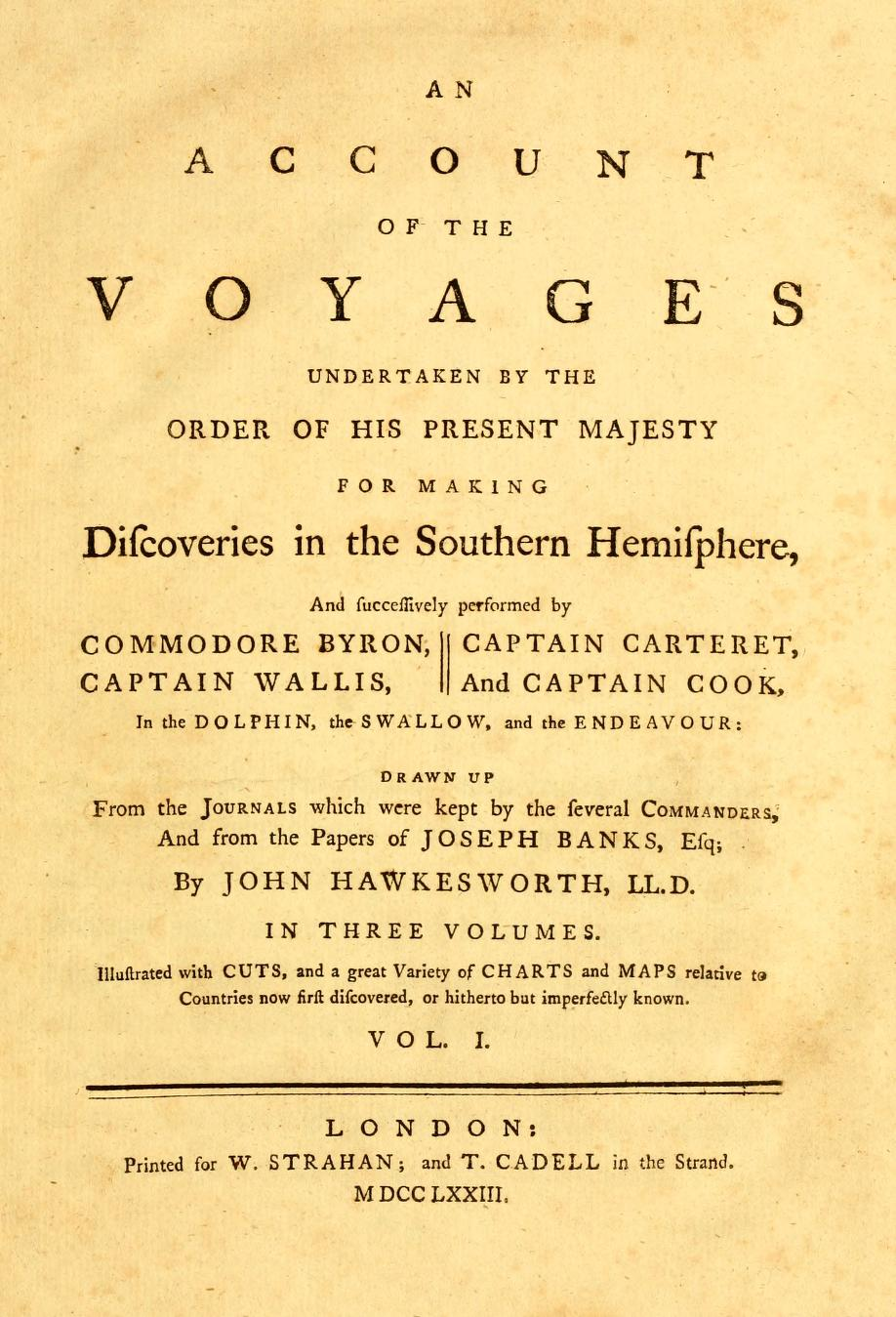
An Account of the Voyages first page, 1773

An Account of the Voyages Undertaken by the Order of his Present Majesty for Making Discoveries in the Southern Hemisphere, and successively performed by Commodore Byron, Captain Wallis, Captain Carteret, and Captain Cook, in the Dolphin, the Swallow, and the Endeavour: drawn up from the journals which were kept by the several commanders, and from the papers of Joseph Banks, Esq. is a 1773 book by John Hawkesworth about several Royal Navy voyages to the Pacific: the 1764–1766 and 1766–1768 voyages of HMS Dolphin under John Byron and Samuel Wallis, the voyage of HMS Swallow under Philip Carteret (1766–1769), as well as the 1768–1771 first voyage of James Cook on HMS Endeavour. Hawkesworth received an advance of £6,000 for editing the three volumes.

== Background ==
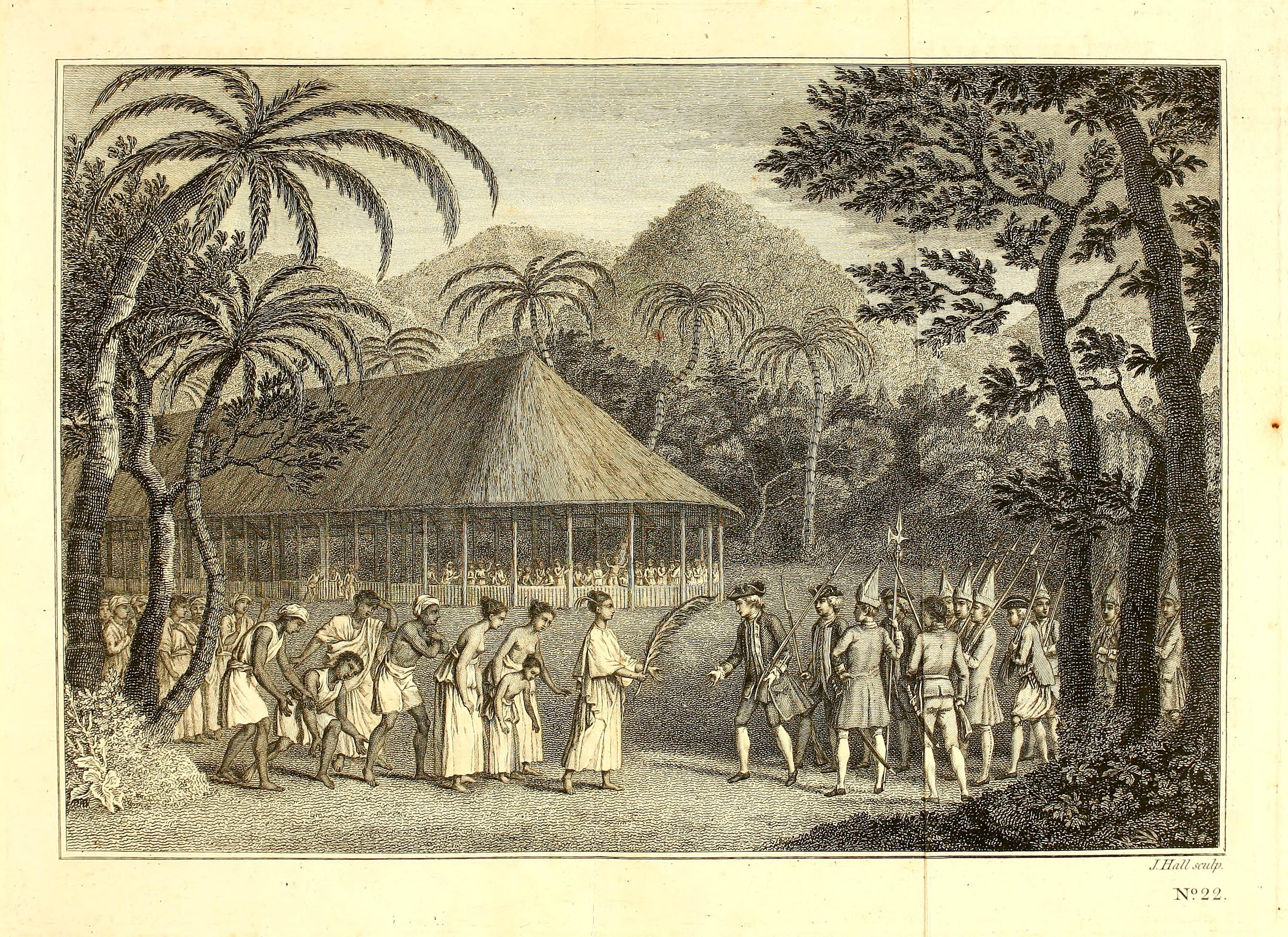
Captain Wallis, on his arrival at O'Taheite, in conversation with Oberea the Queen, engraving by John Hall depicting the 1767 encounter of Samuel Wallis and Queen Purea

In the middle of the 18th century, the knowledge of the Pacific by Europeans was still very limited, with the positions of many islands unknown and only some of the coasts of larger landmasses charted. After the end of the Seven Years' War, the British Admiralty under John Perceval, 2nd Earl of Egmont started to send expeditions to make discoveries in the South Seas, hoping to expand British overseas power and to add new possessions. The first of these voyages was John Byron's 1764–1766 circumnavigation on HMS Dolphin, which made few important discoveries. It was followed in 1766 by the voyages of Samuel Wallis on the Dolphin and Philip Carteret on HMS Swallow, who were supposed to search the South Pacific for a southern continent. The ships were separated; Wallis became the first European to reach Tahiti in 1767 and returned to Britain in May 1768, while Carteret discovered several islands including Pitcairn and returned to Britain in March 1769.

With the dual aims of observing the 1769 transit of Venus from Tahiti and searching for a southern continent, the first voyage of James Cook set out in August 1768. On board was also the botanist Joseph Banks with an entourage including naturalist Daniel Solander and the artists Alexander Buchan and Sydney Parkinson. After sailing to Tahiti and observing the transit of Venus, Cook circumnavigated New Zealand and surveyed its coast, explored the east coast of Australia and passed through Torres Strait between Australia and New Guinea. On the return journey, the ship was repaired at Batavia (now Jakarta), and several crew members including Parkinson died from dysentery. The ship returned to Britain in July 1771.

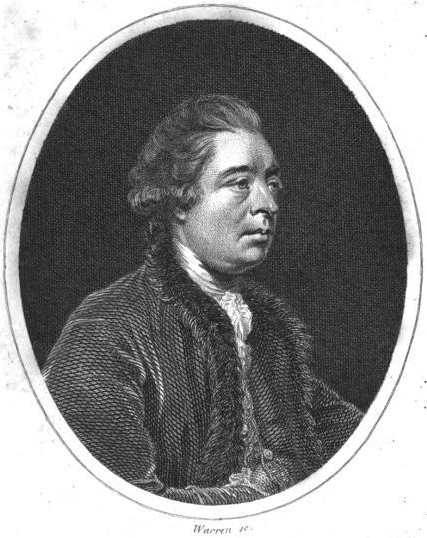
John Hawkesworth

John Hawkesworth was a writer who contributed to The Gentleman's Magazine from 1741 to 1773, worked on The Adventurer together with Samuel Johnson and edited Jonathan Swift's complete works. He was awarded a LL. D. degree by the Archbishop of Canterbury in 1756. In 1771, the Admiralty was looking for an editor for the journals of the recent circumnavigations, and the journal of Frances Burney recounts that her father Charles Burney recommended Hawkesworth to John Montagu, 4th Earl of Sandwich, the First Lord of the Admiralty. The actor David Garrick also supported the choice of Hawkesworth, possibly as a second opinion.

== Writing and publication ==
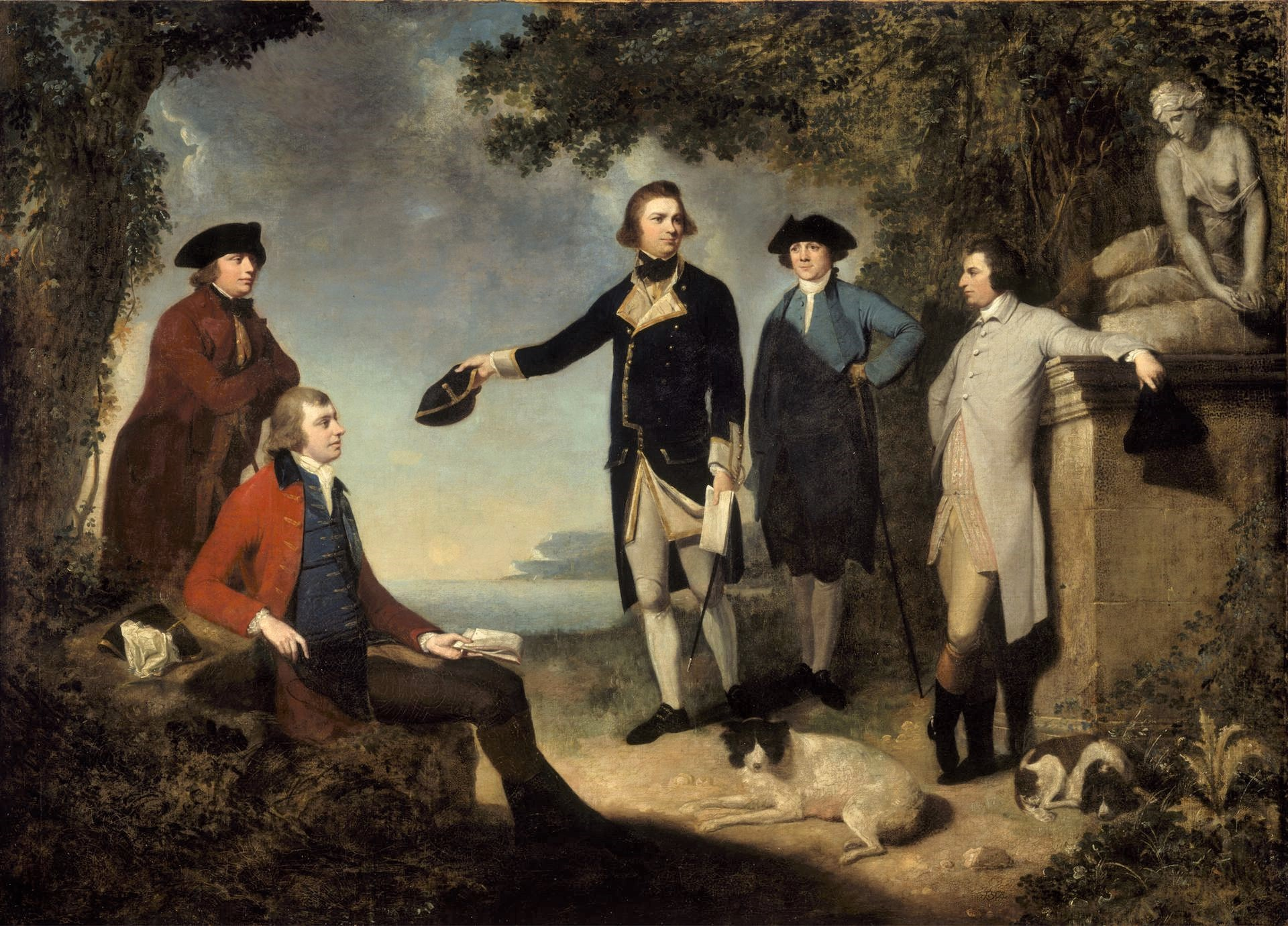
Dr Daniel Solander, Sir Joseph Banks, Captain James Cook, Dr John Hawkesworth and Lord Sandwich by John Hamilton Mortimer, 1771. Use a cursor to see who is who.

Hawkesworth had access to about 57 journals and logs of the voyages, but probably used only a few of them. Sandwich also helped him access the journal of Joseph Banks, and Hawkesworth was pleased to be able to use the writings of an educated gentleman in addition to Cook's journal, which contained more nautical details.

Hawkesworth was allowed to make his own publishing contract, and received the sum of £6,000 (equivalent to £990,000 in 2023) from William Strahan for editing the three volumes of the Account, in "one of the most lucrative literary contracts of the eighteenth century." The success made Hawkesworth overly confident, and he boldly declared "I would do my best to make it another Anson's Voyage", referring to the account of George Anson's voyage around the world. After compiling his draft, Hawkesworth submitted it to Lord Sandwich, and it was read by other Navy personnel, who made some suggestions for correction; however, these were not incorporated. Nevertheless, the book stated that the commanders as well as Banks and Solander had read the manuscript. As Cook was due to depart on his second voyage in 1772, the two volumes regarding Cook's Endeavour journey were prepared first.

Hawkesworth obtained a legal injunction against the competing publication of Parkinson's posthumous Journal of a Voyage to the South Seas, so it was delayed until after the Account appeared on 10 June 1773.

== Content ==
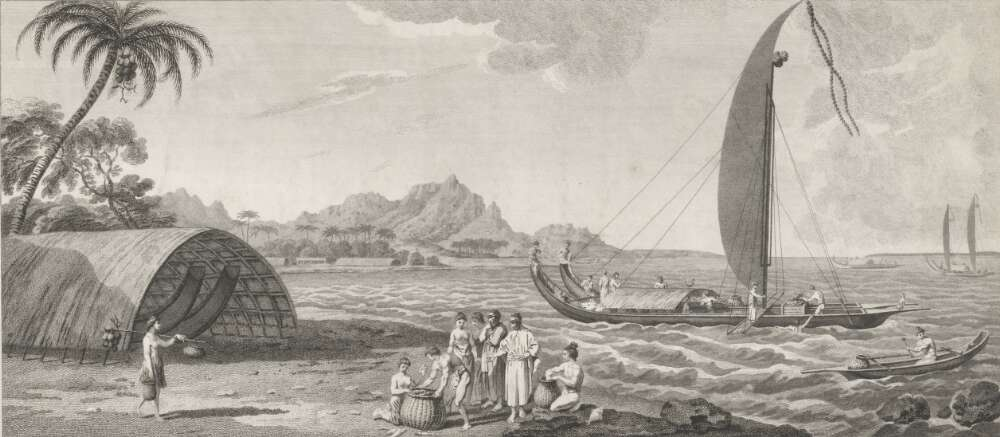
A view in the island of Ulietea with a double canoe and a boathouse, engraved by Edward Rooker, after drawings by Sydney Parkinson, c. 1773

The first volume is split into three parts, each concerned with one circumnavigation. It starts with John Byron's account of the 1764–1766 voyage of HMS Dolphin. This is followed by Samuel Wallis' journal of the 1766–1768 voyage of the same ship that included the first European encounter with Tahiti. The volume ends with Philip Carteret's 1766–1769 circumnavigation on HMS Swallow, where some islands including Pitcairn Island were found.

The second and third volume concern the first voyage of James Cook, with a large amount of content on Tahiti, where HMS Endeavour spent a considerable amount of time to observe the transit of Venus. This is followed by the description of the navigation near New Zealand and the east coast of Australia.

== Illustrations ==
During Wallis' Dolphin expedition, there were no dedicated artists on board. To illustrate the first encounter with the people of Tahiti, the anonymous artist of the illustration Captain Wallis, on his arrival at O'Taheite, in conversation with Oberea the Queen fell back on interpreting Hawkesworth's text and on using oriental imagery from other places. They may have been inspired by engravings in François Valentijn's 1724–1726 Oud en Nieuw Oost-Indiën (Old and New East India).

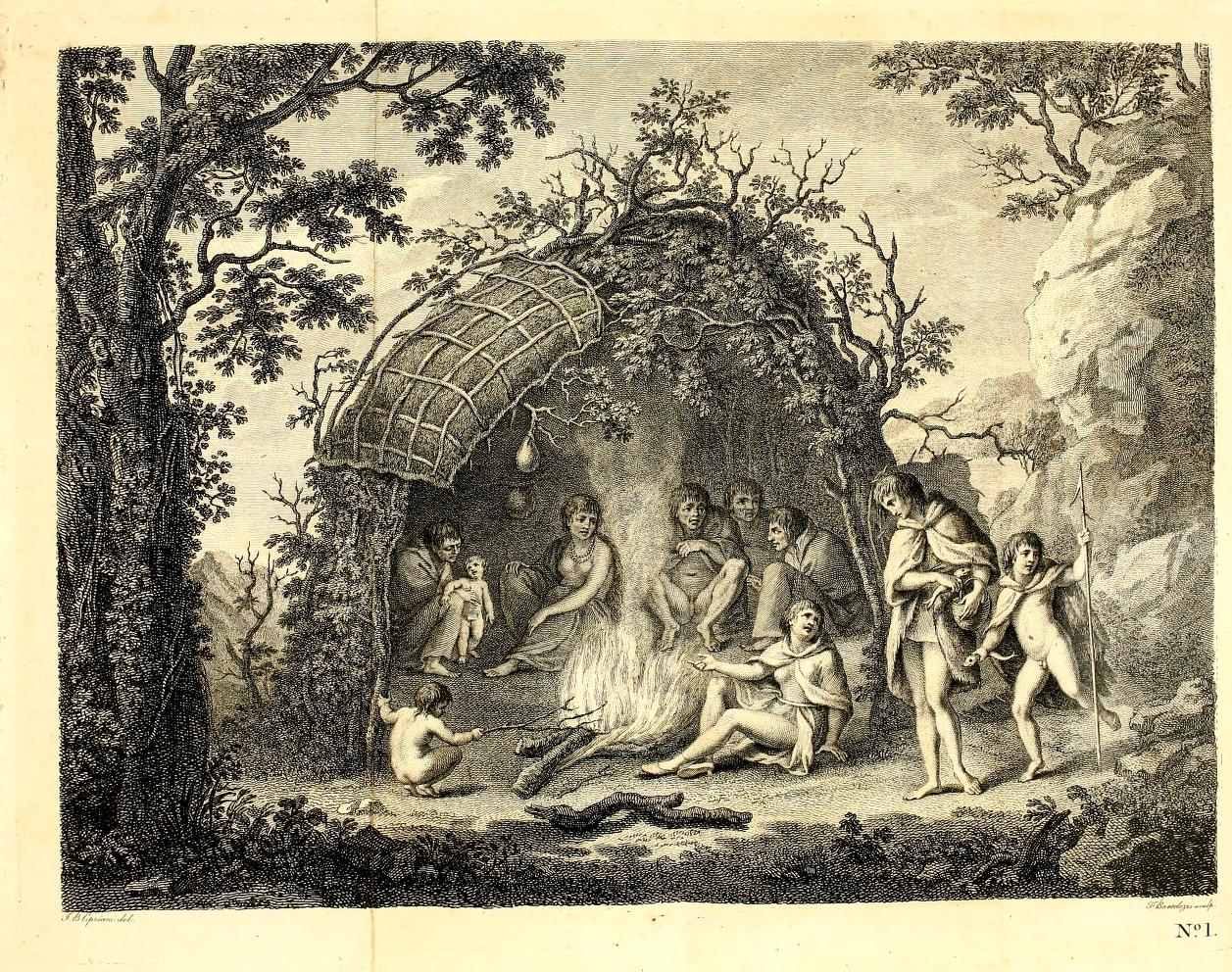
A View of the Indians of Tierra del Fuego in their hut, engraving by Francesco Bartolozzi after a drawing by Giovanni Battista Cipriani

For the Endeavour voyage with James Cook, Joseph Banks brought a party of eight people, that included the two artists Sydney Parkinson for botanical drawings and Alexander Buchan as landscape and figure artist. Work by both artists was later engraved for publication in the Account, but with some changes. Buchan's sketches were made to conform with Hawkesworth's interpretations. Giovanni Battista Cipriani added additional figures to Buchan's Inhabitants of the island of Tierra del Fuego, in their hut before the images were engraved by Francesco Bartolozzi.

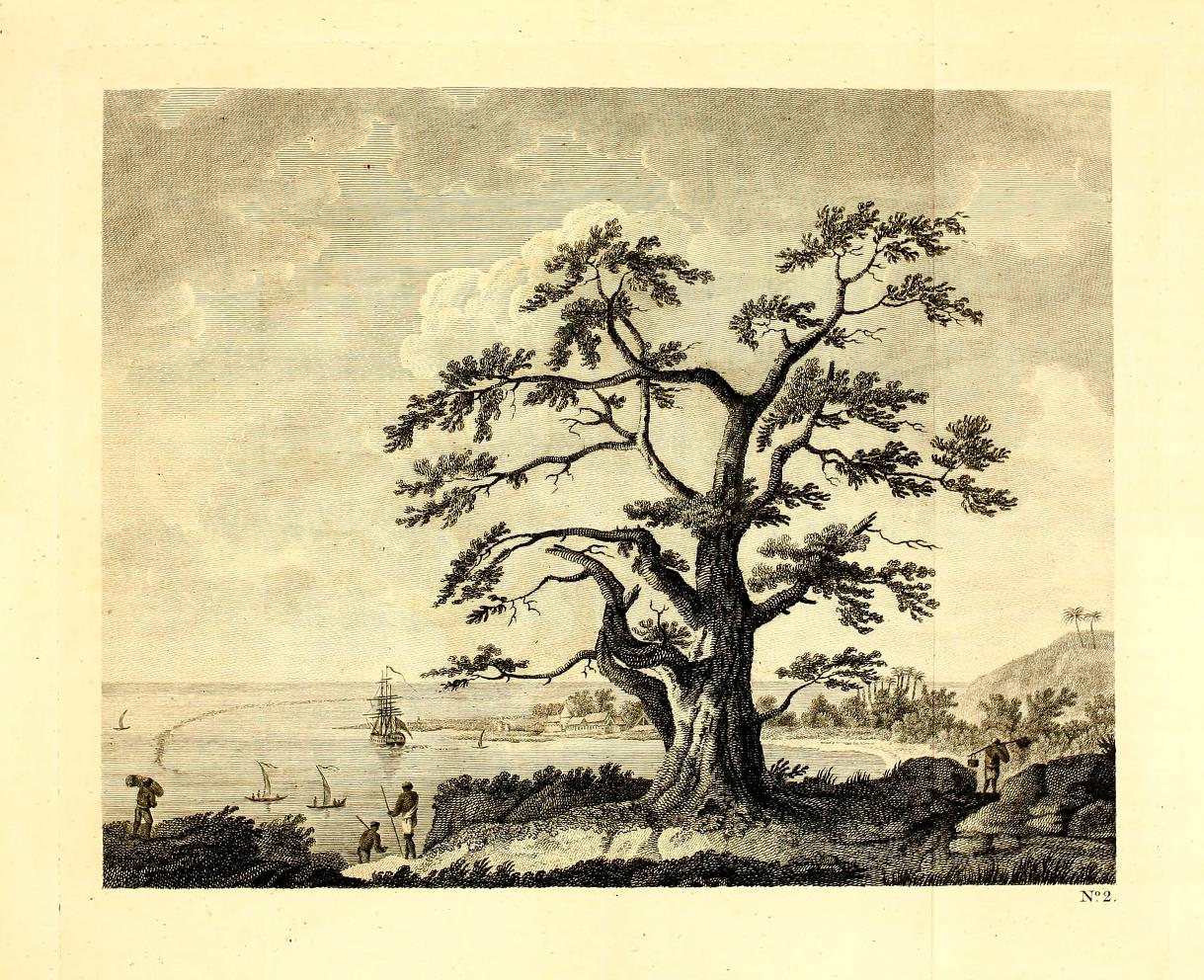
A View of Matavia Bay in Otaheite ... from One Tree Hill, engraving after John James Barralet based on a drawing by Sydney Parkinson. Point Venus can be seen across Matavai Bay, where HMS Endeavour lies anchored.

Some of the engravings in the Account were based on Parkinson's drawings, but this was not acknowledged; Joseph Banks himself had written to Hawkesworth advising against it. Some alterations were made; for example, Parkinson's original of Tree on One Tree Hill contains a seated figure of a person drawing as well as two Europeans; in the drawing by John James Barralet that was engraved for the Account, the seated figure has been erased and the Europeans have been replaced by Tahitians. It is possible that the seated figure depicts Parkinson himself and that he was removed at Banks' request.

== Reception ==
The first edition of the Account sold quickly, and a second edition came out in August of 1773. Further editions followed, including an American edition in 1773 and French and German translations in 1774. The book was generally very popular with the public. For example, it was the most borrowed book in the Bristol library between 1773 and 1784.

However, the book was immediately criticised quite vehemently, and the amount of abuse heaped on Hawkesworth was considered to have contributed to his death in November 1773. Critics came from different directions; apart from criticism from seamen and the commanders whose journals had been used, flaws were found with Hawkesworth's morals, theology, geography, and with the excessive payment he had received. There was outrage about the descriptions of Tahitian sexuality that Hawkesworth did not censor. Writing about the Endeavour's shipwreck at Endeavour Reef, Hawkesworth had not accepted Providence, or divine intervention, as means by which Cook and his crew had escaped disaster. His deism-influenced views were unorthodox and offended religious sensibilities. The geographer Alexander Dalrymple, a strong believer in theory of a southern continent, published a pamphlet attacking Hawkesworth and Cook, in which he complained about differences between the narrative and the charts and defended his belief in Terra australis.

James Cook first read Hawkesworth's Account at the Cape of Good Hope in 1775, on the return leg of his second voyage, and was shocked to read Banks's words appearing as his as well as the statement that he had read and approved the manuscript. When they stopped at St Helena, wheelbarrows were conspicuously placed around Cook's lodgings. Georg Forster, who accompanied Cook, wrote about the scene in his book A Voyage Round the World: "Dr. Hawkesworth's account of captain Cook's first voyage round the world, in the Endeavour, had reached this island some time before; it had been eagerly perused, and several articles, relative to this settlement, were now taken notice of with great good humour and pleasant raillery. The total want of wheelbarrows, and the ill-treatment of the slaves, which are spoken of in that account, were reckoned particularly injurious, and captain Cook was called upon to defend himself. Mrs. Skottowe, the sprightliest lady on the island, displayed to advantage her witty and satirical talents, from which there was no other escape left, than to lay the blame on the absent philosophers whose papers had been consulted."

In 2004, the literary scholar Philip Edwards, described the Account as a "laundering of the actual record of the remorseless advance into the Pacific" and criticised the way that different witnesses of the event were merged into a single voice, losing their individuality.

== Legacy ==
For more than a century, Hawkesworth's Account was the most authoritative source for the voyages it covered. For Wallis's journey, an additional text appeared in 1948, the journal of the Dolphin's master, George Robertson. Cook's journals were published in their original text in an edition by William Wharton in 1893; the next authoritative publication was John Beaglehole's 1955 edition of Cook's journals, where Beaglehole himself stated "for a hundred and twenty years, so far as the first voyage was concerned, Hawkesworth was Cook."

Another lasting legacy of Hawkesworth's Account was that his merging of the commanders into a single first-person narrator created the heroic British explorer as a literary character that would stay popular for more than 200 years.

== See also ==
- Endeavour journal of James Cook

== Sources ==
- Abbott, John Lawrence (1970). "John Hawkesworth: Friend of Samuel Johnson and Editor of Captain Cook's Voyages and of the Gentleman's Magazine". Eighteenth-Century Studies. 3 (3): 339–350. doi:10.2307/2737875. ISSN 0013-2586. JSTOR 2737875.
- Abbott, John Lawrence (1982). John Hawkesworth : eighteenth-century man of letters. Madison: University of Wisconsin Press. ISBN 978-0-299-08610-7.
- Beaglehole, John C. (1962). The Endeavour journal of Joseph Banks 1768–1771. Sydney: Trustees of Public Library of N.S.W. in association with Angus and Robertson. OCLC 222980498.
- Beaglehole, John C. (1968) [1955]. The Journals of Captain James Cook: the Voyage of the Endeavour, 1768–1771. Cambridge: Cambridge University Press for the Hakluyt Society. OCLC 223185477.
- Beaglehole, John C. (1974). The Life of Captain James Cook. London: Adam & Charles Black. OCLC 480115019.
- Binney, Matthew W. (1 May 2016). "The Authority of Entertainment: John Hawkesworth's An Account of the Voyages". Modern Philology. 113 (4): 530–549. doi:10.1086/685390. ISSN 0026-8232. S2CID 163754901.
- Carrington, Hugh (1948). The Discovery of Tahiti. London: Hakluyt Soc. OCLC 250592706.
- D'Arblay, Frances (1832). Memoirs of doctor Burney arranged from his own manuscripts from family papers, and from personal recollections. Moxon.
- Edwards, Philip (1994). The Story of the Voyage: Sea-Narratives in Eighteenth-Century England. Cambridge University Press. ISBN 978-0-521-60426-0.
- Forster, George (1777). A Voyage Round the World: In His Britannic Majesty's Sloop, Resolution, Commanded by Capt. James Cook, During the Years 1772, 3, 4, and 5. Vol. II. London: B. White.
- Joppien, Rüdiger; Smith, Bernard (1985). The Art of Captain Cook's Voyages. Vol. One. The Voyage of the Endeavour 1768–1771. New Haven and London: Published for the Paul Mellon Centre for Studies in British Art by Yale University Press. ISBN 0-300-03450-4. OCLC 12544694.
- Leask, Nigel (10 January 2002). Curiosity and the Aesthetics of Travel-Writing, 1770–1840: 'From an Antique Land'. OUP Oxford. ISBN 978-0-19-155439-1.
- Pearson, W. H. (1 January 1972). "Hawkesworth's alterations". The Journal of Pacific History. 7 (1): 45–72. doi:10.1080/00223347208572200. ISSN 0022-3344.
- Ritchie, G. S. (1 April 1978). "Captain Cook's Influence on Hydrographic Surveying". Pacific Studies. 1: 78–95.
- Smith, Bernard (1985). European vision and the South Pacific. New Haven: Yale University Press. ISBN 978-0-300-02815-7.
- Smith, Bernard (1992). Imagining the Pacific : in the wake of the Cook voyages. New Haven: Yale University Press. ISBN 978-0-300-05053-0.
- Spate, O. H. K. (1988). "Seamen and Scientists: The Literature of the Pacific, 1697-1798". In Macleod, Roy; Rehbock, Philip F. (eds.). Nature in its Greatest Extent. University of Hawaii Press. pp. 13–26. doi:10.1515/9780824890766-004. ISBN 978-0-8248-9076-6.
- Wallis, Helen (1965). Carteret's Voyage round the World, 1766–1769. London: Hakluyt Society. OCLC 562056101.
- Wallis, Helen (1 April 1978). "Publication of Cook's Journals: Some New Sources and Assessments". Pacific Studies. 1: 163–194.
- Williams, Glyndwr (2001). The prize of all the oceans : Commodore Anson's daring voyage and triumphant capture of the Spanish treasure galleon. New York: Penguin Books. ISBN 978-0-14-100226-2.
- Williams, Glyndwr (15 May 2020). "Pacific Voyages". In Edney, Matthew H.; Pedley, Mary Sponberg (eds.). The History of Cartography, Volume 4: Cartography in the European Enlightenment. University of Chicago Press. pp. 1083–1090. ISBN 978-0-226-33922-1.

== Scans of the first edition ==
- Hawkesworth, John (1773). An account of the voyages undertaken by the order of His present Majesty for making discoveries in the Southern Hemisphere, and successively performed by Commodore Byron, Captain Wallis, Captain Carteret, and Captain Cook, in the Dolphin, the Swallow, and the Endeavour: drawn up from the journals which were kept by the several commanders, and from the papers of Joseph Banks, esq.;. Vol. I. London: Printed for W. Strahan and T. Cadell.
- Hawkesworth, John (1773). An account of the voyages undertaken by the order of His present Majesty for making discoveries in the Southern Hemisphere, and successively performed by Commodore Byron, Captain Wallis, Captain Carteret, and Captain Cook, in the Dolphin, the Swallow, and the Endeavour: drawn up from the journals which were kept by the several commanders, and from the papers of Joseph Banks, esq.;. Vol. II. London: Printed for W. Strahan and T. Cadell.
- Hawkesworth, John (1773). An account of the voyages undertaken by the order of His present Majesty for making discoveries in the Southern Hemisphere, and successively performed by Commodore Byron, Captain Wallis, Captain Carteret, and Captain Cook, in the Dolphin, the Swallow, and the Endeavour: drawn up from the journals which were kept by the several commanders, and from the papers of Joseph Banks, esq.;. Vol. III. London: Printed for W. Strahan and T. Cadell.
