= Borghese Gladiator =

Hellenistic marble sculpture of a swordsman

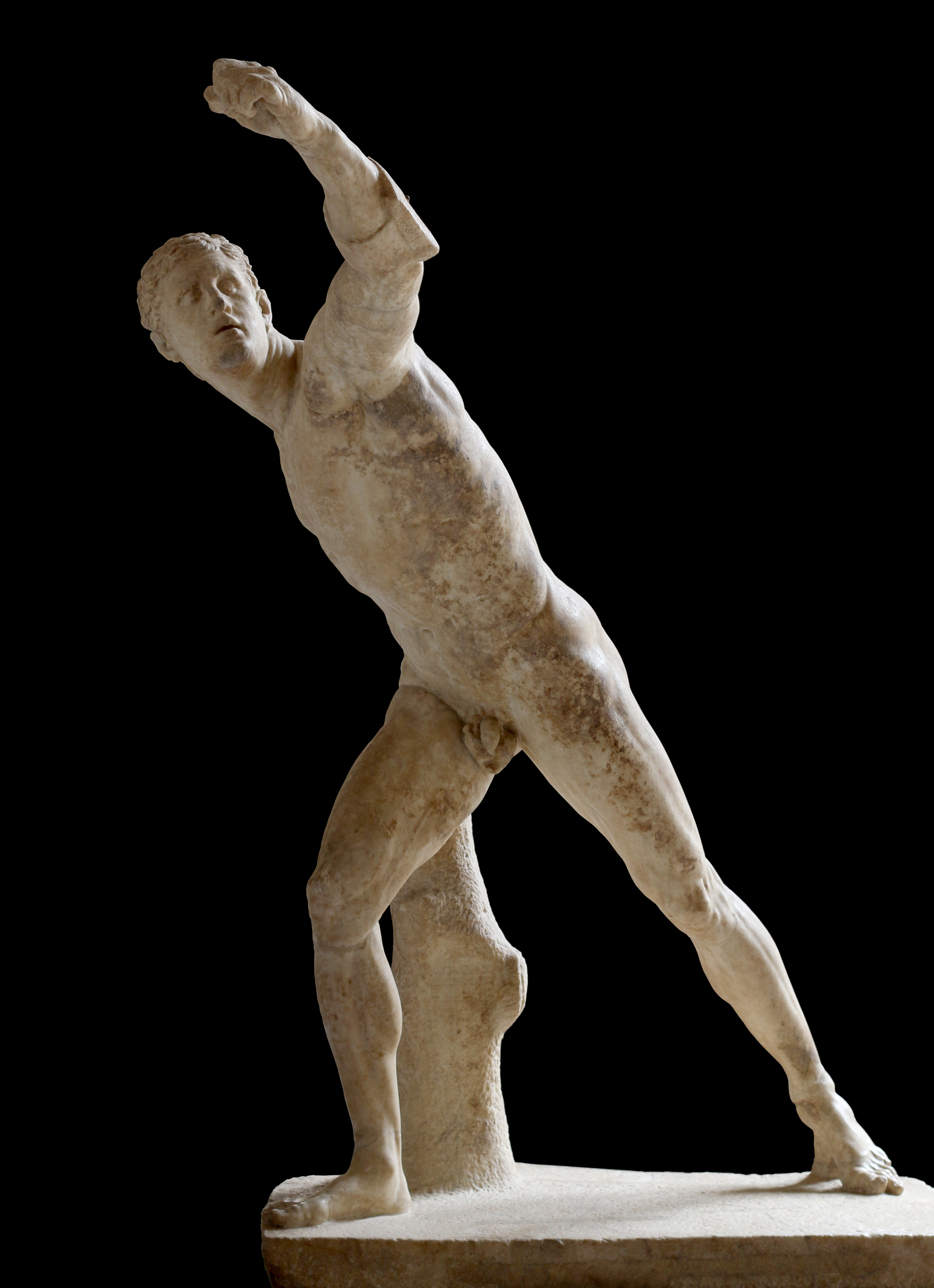
- Artist: Agasias of Ephesus (signature)
- Year: c.100 BC
- Type: Marble
- Dimensions: 199 cm (78 in)
- Location: Musée du Louvre; Paris

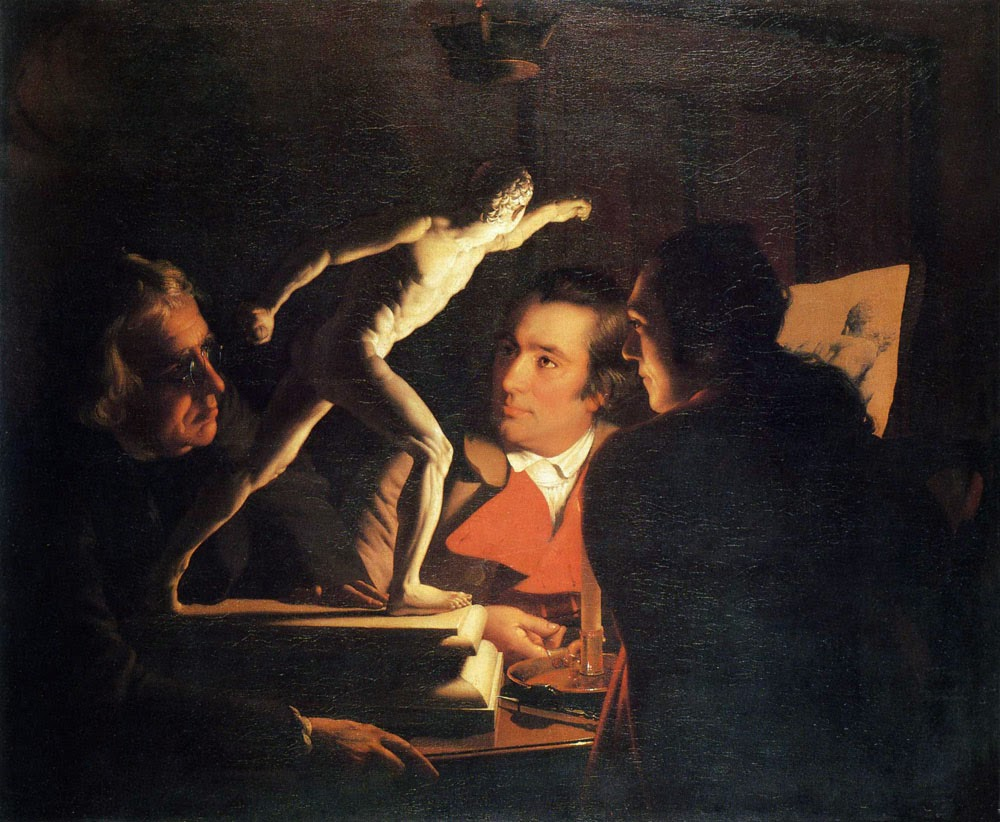
Three Persons Viewing the Gladiator by Candlelight, by Joseph Wright of Derby, 1765.

The Borghese Gladiator is a Hellenistic life-size marble sculpture portraying a swordsman, created at Ephesus about 100 BC, now on display at the Louvre.

== Sculptor ==
The sculpture is signed on the pedestal by Agasias, son of Dositheus, who is otherwise unknown. It is not quite clear whether the Agasias who is mentioned as the father of Heraclides is the same person. Agasias, son of Menophilus may have been a cousin.

== Rediscovery ==
It was found before 1611, in the present territory of Anzio south of Rome, among the ruins of a seaside palace of Nero on the site of the ancient Antium. From the attitude of the figure it is clear that the statue represents not a gladiator, but a warrior contending with a mounted combatant. In the days when antique sculptures gained immediacy by being identified with specific figures from history or literature, Friedrich Thiersch conjectured that it was intended to represent Achilles fighting with the mounted Amazon, Penthesilea.

The sculpture was added to the Borghese collection in Rome. At the Villa Borghese it stood in a ground-floor room named for it, redecorated in the early 1780s by Antonio Asprucci. Camillo Borghese was pressured to sell it to his brother-in-law, Napoleon Bonaparte, in 1807; it was taken to Paris when the Borghese collection was acquired for the Louvre, where it now resides.

Misnamed a gladiator due to an erroneous restoration, it was among the most admired and copied works of antiquity in the eighteenth century, providing sculptors a canon of proportions. A bronze cast was made for Charles I of England (now at Windsor), and another by Hubert Le Sueur was the centrepiece of Isaac de Caus' parterre at Wilton House; that version was given by the 8th Earl of Pembroke to Sir Robert Walpole and remains the focal figure in William Kent's Hall at Houghton Hall, Norfolk. Other copies can be found at Petworth House, at Castle Howard, and in the Green Court at Knole. Originally a copy was also located in Lord Burlington's garden at Chiswick House and later relocated to the gardens at Chatsworth in Derbyshire. In the United States, a copy of "The Gladiator at Montalto" was among the furnishings of an ideal gallery of instructive art imagined by Thomas Jefferson for Monticello.

== In painting ==
- Having seen the sculpture on his Italian travels, Rubens included a figure of Fury in the same pose (seen from behind) in one of the scenes of his allegorical Palais de Luxembourg cycle of paintings for Marie de' Medici, the Conclusion of the Peace at Angers, conserved at the Louvre; the figure of Fury is bottom right.
- The figure in the water (Brook Watson) in Watson and the Shark by John Singleton Copley is based on the sculpture's pose.
- It was known, although not in the French national collection, when Ménageot included it in the background of his The Death of Leonardo da Vinci in the arms of Francis I (1781); indeed, he probably saw it at the Villa Borghese during his stay at the French Academy in Rome from 1769 to 1774. However, it was an anachronism in such a setting since Leonardo died in 1519, about ninety years before the statue was discovered.
- The stance and attitude of the warriors in Thomas Chambers's Two of the Natives of New Holland, Advancing to Combat (based on a drawing by Sydney Parkinson and illustrating his posthumous A Journal of a Voyage to the South Seas), a typical engraving in the noble savage ideal, is said to have been based upon the Borghese Gladiator.
- The headless statue in Thomas Cole's 1836 painting Destruction (the fourth painting in his The Course of Empire series) is based on the Borghese warrior.
- The pose of Phineas in Luca Giordano's c. 1660 painting Perseus turning Phineas and his Followers to Stone in the National Gallery, London appears to mirror the Borghese Gladiator.
