= Bahia Buen Suceso =

Bay in Tierra del Fuego, Argentina

Coordinates: 54°47′59″S 65°15′48″W

Bahía Buen Suceso is a small bay in Argentina's Tierra del Fuego province. It is known in English as Bay of Good Success, Bay of Success and Success Bay. It is located on the western shore of Le Maire Strait, which separates Tierra del Fuego and Isla de los Estados (Staten Island).

The bay was named during the Garcia de Nodal expedition of 1618-1619 after the caravel Nuestra Señora del Buen Suceso. The bay was used as a watering point by Cook on his first and second voyages; by King in 1830 and by Fitzroy and Darwin during the second voyage of HMS Beagle in December 1832.

According to King:

Good Success Bay is an excellent anchorage for vessels of any size to stop in for wood or water; but it would not answer if a vessel required to lie steady for repair, as a swell frequently rolls in. It is quite safe, yet, in the winter season, when easterly gales are common, no vessel should anchor so near the head of the bay as she might in summer; for heavy rollers at times (though rarely) set in. Fish we did not try to get, not having spare time, and only a few birds were shot.
