= Agasias, son of Menophilus =

Agasias (Ancient Greek: Ἀγασίας), son of Menophilus was an Ancient Greek sculptor from Ephesus. He was possibly the cousin of Agasias, son of Dositheus, sculptor of the Borghese Gladiator. He is mentioned in a Greek inscription, from which it appears that he exercised his art in Delos while that island was under Roman sway; probably some time about 100 BC. He probably sculpted a striking figure of a warrior now in the National Archaeological Museum, Athens.
