= Two of the Natives of New Holland, Advancing to Combat =

Famous art piece of two Gweagal men

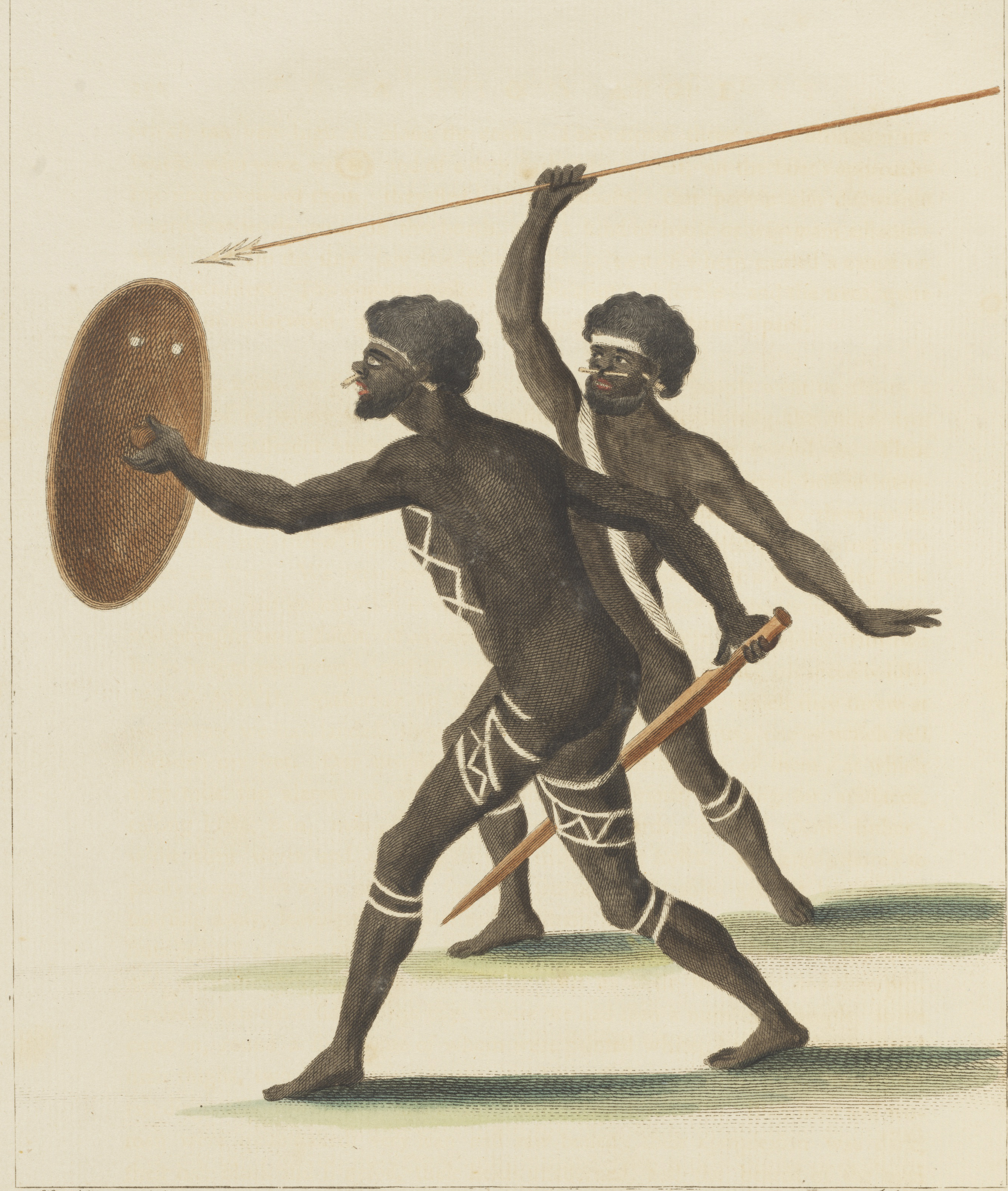
Painted engraving of Two of the Natives, as published in 1773.

Two of the Natives of New Holland, Advancing to Combat is an engraving published in 1773, based on a sketch made by Sydney Parkinson in 1770 at Kamay (Botany Bay). The final image was engraved by Thomas Chambers and is a significant early European depiction of Aboriginal Australians. While often attributed solely to Parkinson, the final work is recognised as a European artistic interpretation, incorporating classical poses and inaccuracies not present in Parkinson's original on-site drawing.

The image depicts two Gweagal warriors who resisted the landing party of HMS Endeavour. Although Parkinson's sketch was made during the encounter, he died during the voyage. The widely known engraving was created in London by Chambers, an artist who never visited Australia. The work is frequently cited as an example of the "noble savage" ideal in art and is one of the most famous images from the early period of contact.

== Historical Context ==
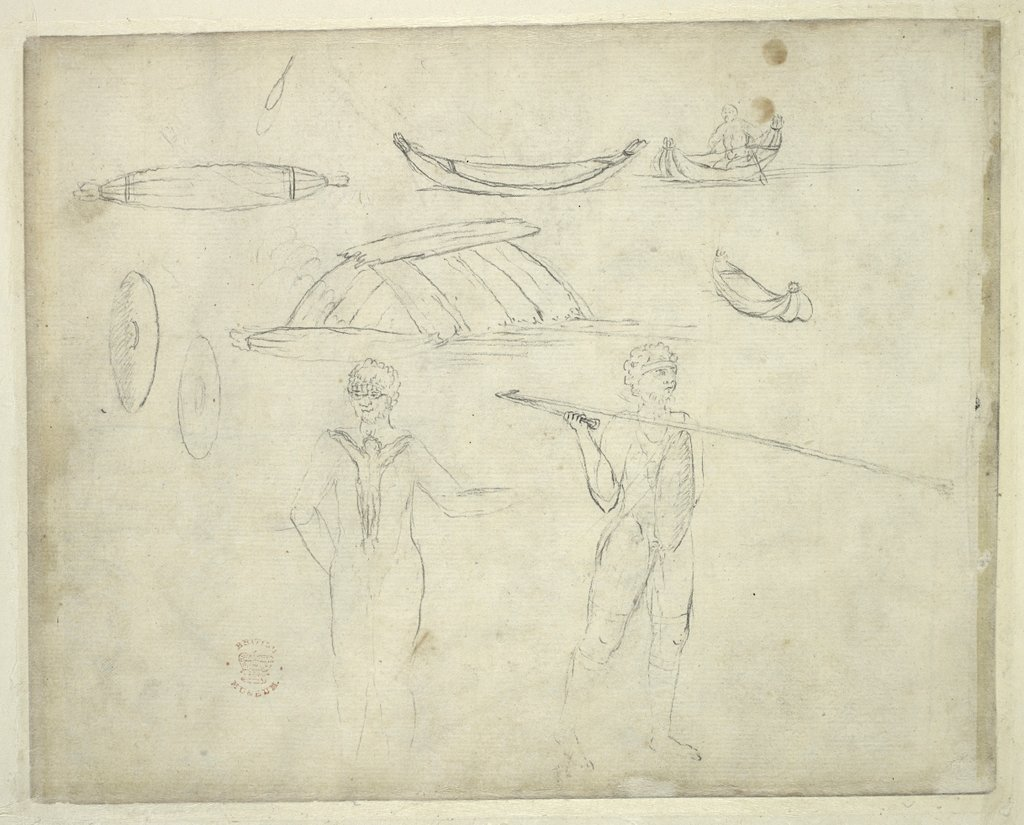
Original engraving by Sydney Parkinson.

In April 1770, HMS Endeavour anchored at Kamay, on the traditional lands of the Gweagal people of the Dharawal nation. The image is based on the initial encounter where two Gweagal men resisted the landing of James Cook's party on the southern shore. After a confrontation in which the ship's crew shot one of the warriors, the two warriors retreated.

Following this, members of the Endeavour crew went to the Gweagal camp near the beach. According to the journals of Joseph Banks and James Cook, they found children hiding in the huts and left them gifts, such as nails and beads. They also collected a large number of cultural objects, taking between forty and fifty spears and at least one shield. In his journal, Banks expressed his belief that "from the distance the people had been from us when we fird that the shot could have done them no material harm." This perspective is contradicted by Gweagal oral history, which maintains that a leader named Cooman was wounded or killed in this encounter.

== Creation and Attribution ==
The basis for the engraving was a field sketch by Sydney Parkinson, a botanical artist on the Endeavour. His original sketch, now held by the British Library, is a brief, un-stylised depiction consistent with his other on-site drawings. Parkinson died of dysentery in 1771 during the voyage home, before his work could be finalized for publication.

The final image was produced two years later in London. The engraver Thomas Chambers was commissioned to create a plate based on Parkinson's sketch for John Hawkesworth's official account of the voyage, A Journal of a Voyage to the South Seas (1773). As was standard practice for the period, the published engraving credits both Parkinson as the original artist and Chambers as the engraver.

=== Artistic Analysis and Inaccuracies ===
While based on a real event, the engraving by Chambers is understood to be a European artistic construct rather than a faithful ethnographic record. The final image incorporates several significant alterations and inaccuracies.

The warriors' stances do not reflect how they would have stood, but are instead based on classical European artistic conventions intended to convey heroism and defiance. The pose of the lead warrior is said to be modelled on the Borghese Gladiator, a famous Hellenistic sculpture. Wayne Shipp, CEO of the Eden Local Aboriginal Land Council, has noted that the men are depicted in classical Greek poses.

The weapons shown in the engraving are also inaccurate. Shipp identifies the shield as a European-style "Hoplite shield" and states that "you won’t find a wooden sword like that in the Sydney basin." A further significant alteration from Parkinson's original sketch is the omission of the woomera (spear-thrower). While the original drawing correctly shows a warrior holding a spear with a woomera, Chambers' engraving depicts the man holding the spear by its centre shaft, a method not used for throwing. The white body decorations shown in the engraving are also considered part of this European stylisation.

=== Status as Earliest European Depiction ===
Despite a common misconception, the image is not the earliest known European depiction of an Aboriginal Australian. That distinction is believed to belong to a 1698 engraving of men from the Kimberley region after the voyage of the English privateer William Dampier.

== See also ==
- Gweagal
- Cooman
- Sydney Parkinson
- Kamay Botany Bay National Park
- Noble savage
