= Agasias of Arcadia =

5th-century Greek soldier

Agasias
- Ἀγασίας
- Military career
- Allegiance: Arcadia
- Branch: Army of the Ten Thousand

Agasias (Ancient Greek: Ἀγασίας) was a Stymphalian of Arcadia who was frequently mentioned by Xenophon as a brave and active officer in the Army of the Ten Thousand. He was an acquaintance of both Hiero I of Syracuse and Xenophon. In his youth, he achieved an Olympic victory, and hired Pindar to compose a song of celebration. He was wounded while fighting against Asidates.
