= Bernard Smith (art historian) =

Australian art historian, critic and academic (1916–2011)

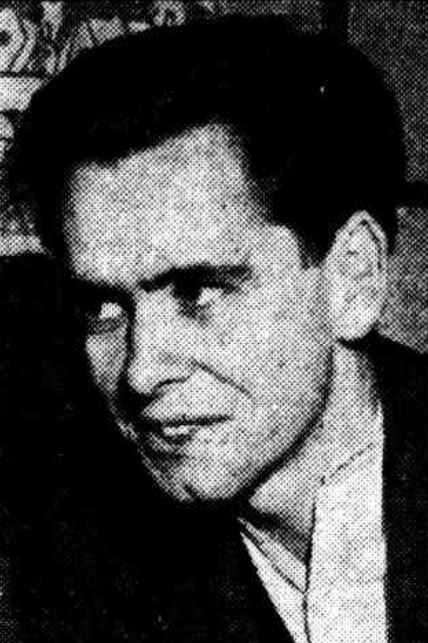
- Born: 3 October 1916
- Died: 2 September 2011 (aged 94)
- Occupations: Art historian, university teacher, academic, art critic
- Awards: Fellow of the Australian Academy of the Humanities (1969)

Bernard William Smith (3 October 1916 – 2 September 2011) was an Australian art historian, critic and cultural historian who played a central role in the development of Australian art history as an academic field.

His pioneering book European Vision and the South Pacific (1960) examined the visual culture of European exploration and its relationship to Enlightenment, analysing how representations of the Pacific formed part of broader European attempts to understand and interpret newly encountered parts of the world. The book has been described as the most influential work of scholarship produced by an Australian art historian and has had a lasting impact on the study of the colonial encounter.

Through works such as Place, Taste and Tradition (1945), Australian Painting 1788–1960 (1962), and his 1980 ABC Boyer Lectures The Spectre of Truganini (1980), Smith examined the development of Australian art and explored broader questions of Australian cultural history and historical memory.

Smith held appointments at several Australian universities, including the University of Melbourne and as the founding Professor of the Power Institute, The University of Sydney.

In 1991 Smith established the Kate Challis RAKA in memory of his wife Kate (1915–1989). Awarded annually and valued at $20,000, the prize recognises outstanding work by Australian Indigenous writers and artists.

== Biography ==
Smith was born in Balmain, Sydney, to Charles Smith and Rose Anne Tierney on 3 October 1916. An illegitimate child, he was a ward of the state and raised in foster care, experiences he later described in his award winning autobiography The Boy Adeodatus. The Portrait of a Lucky Young Bastard (1984), which won the Victorian Premier’s Literary Award for Non-Fiction (Nettie Palmer Prize) in 1985..

Smith was educated at the University of Sydney. Between 1935 and 1944, he taught in the NSW Department of Education. In 1944 he became an education officer for the Art Gallery of NSW organising travelling art exhibitions.

In 1948, he was awarded a scholarship to study at the Warburg and Courtauld Institutes, University of London. On his return to Australia in 1951, Smith resumed his position at the Art Gallery of NSW. In 1952, he received a research scholarship at the newly established Australian National University, where he completed a PhD. A shorter version of his thesis, European Vision and the South Pacific, was published in 1950, and released as a monograph in 1960 by Oxford University Press.

Smith was appointed lecturer and then a senior lecturer in the University of Melbourne's Fine Arts Department (1955–1967). In 1959, he convened a group of seven emerging figurative painters known as the Antipodeans, which organised its only exhibition in August 1959 and with them composed The Antipodean Manifesto. Between 1963 and 1966, he worked as an art critic for The Age newspaper in Melbourne.

In 1967, he became the founding Professor of Contemporary Art and director of the Power Institute of Fine Arts, University of Sydney, a position he held until his retirement in 1977. During this period he was also involved in debates about the role of art and architecture in contemporary Australian society. He was associated with the art workshop known as the Tin Sheds, although he clashed with some of its founders over its direction. Smith was also active in heritage campaigns in the inner-city suburb of Glebe. In 1969 he became an inaugural president of the Glebe Society, which was formed to oppose large-scale redevelopment proposals and promote the conservation of the suburb’s nineteenth-century streetscapes. With his wife, Kate Challis, he published The Architectural Character of Glebe (1973), documenting the architectural history of the suburb.

After his retirement from full-time academic positions, he returned to Melbourne, served as president of the Australian Academy of the Humanities and continued to publish extensively. With the German art historian Rüdiger Joppien, he co-edited The Art of Captain Cook’s Voyages, a three-volume study of the visual material produced during the expeditions of James Cook. In 1993 he published Noel Counihan: Artist and Revolutionary, a biography of the Australian social realist artist Noel Counihan.

In 1980, he presented the Boyer Lectures entitled The Spectre of Truganini brought the history of colonisation into mainstream public debate and was one of the first public condemnations of the Australian government's policy of removing Australian Aboriginal and Torres Strait Islander children from their families, now known as the Stolen Generations.

Smith was appointed Chevalier of the Ordre des Arts et des Lettres.

Smith’s papers are held by the National Library of Australia, and his personal library is held by the State Library Victoria.

== Books ==
- Place, Taste and Tradition: A Study of Australian Art Since 1788. Sydney: Ure Smith, 1945 (reprinted Melbourne: Oxford University Press, 1979)
- A Catalogue of Australian Oil Paintings in the National Art Gallery of New South Wales 1875–1952. Sydney: The Gallery, 1953
- European Vision and the South Pacific, 1768–1850: A Study in the History of Art and Ideas. Oxford: Clarendon Press, 1960 (reprinted 1985 by Yale University Press and 2022 by Miegunyah Press)
- Australian Painting Today: The John Murtagh Macrossan memorial lecture, 1961. St. Lucia, Queensland: Queensland University Press, 1962
- Australian Painting, 1788–2000 Melbourne: Oxford University Press, 1962. (updated 1971; updated 1991 with Terry Smith; & update 2001 with Christopher Heathcote)
- The Architectural Character of Glebe, Sydney (with Kate Smith). Sydney: University Co-operative Bookshop Press, 1973 (reprinted 1985)
- Concerning Contemporary Art: the Power lectures, 1968–1973 (ed.). Oxford: Clarendon Press, 1975
- Documents on Art and Taste in Australia: the colonial period, 1770–1914. (ed.) Melbourne: Oxford University Press, 1975
- The Antipodean Manifesto: Essays in Art and History. Melbourne: Oxford University Press, 1975
- Art as Information: Reflections on the Art from Captain Cook's Voyages. Sydney: Sydney University Press, 1979
- The Spectre of Truganini. Sydney: Australian Broadcasting Commission, 1980
- The Boy Adeodatus—The Portrait of a Lucky Young Bastard. Ringwood, Victoria: Allen Lane, 1984 (reprinted 1985, 1994)
- The Art of Captain Cook's Voyages (with Rüdiger Joppien). Melbourne: Oxford University Press, three volumes, 1985–1987
- The Death of the Artist as Hero: Essays in History and Culture. Melbourne: Oxford University Press, 1988
- The Art of the First Fleet and Other Early Australian Drawings (eds Bernard Smith and Alwyne Wheeler). Melbourne: Oxford University Press, 1988
- Baudin in Australian Waters: The Artwork of the French Voyage of Discovery to the Southern Lands 1800–1804 (eds J. Bonnemains, E. Forsyth and B. Smith). Melbourne: Oxford University Press, 1988
- Terra Australis—The Furthest Shore (eds. W. Eisler and B. Smith). Sydney: International Cultural Corporation of Australia, 1988
- The Critic as Advocate: selected essays 1941–1988. Melbourne: Oxford University Press Australia, 1989
- Imagining the Pacific in the Wake of the Cook Voyages. Carlton, Victoria: Melbourne University Press at the Miegunyah Press, 1992
- Noel Counihan—Artist and Revolutionary . Melbourne; New York: Oxford University Press, 1993
- Poems 1938–1993. Carlton, Victoria: Meanjin, 1996
- Modernism's History: A Study in Twentieth-century Art and Ideas. New Haven: Yale University Press, 1998
- A Pavane for Another Time Sydney. Macmillan, 2002
- The Formalesque: A Guide to Modern Art and Its History. Melbourne: Macmillan, 2007

== Selected essays and articles ==
- "European Vision and the South Pacific", Journal of the Warburg and Courtauld Institutes 8, no. 1/2 (1950): 65–100
- "Coleridge's Ancient Mariner and Cook's second voyage", Journal of the Warburg and Courtauld Institutes 19, no. (1956) 117–152
- "Art Historical Studies in Australia with Comments on Research and Publication since 1974" (PDF). Proceedings of the Australian Academy of the Humanities. 12 (1982–83): 44–73. Archived from the original (PDF) on 15 September 2009.
- "Sir Joseph Burke, 1913–1992" (PDF). Proceedings of the Australian Academy of the Humanities. 17 (1992): 46–49. Archived from the original (PDF) on 15 September 2009.
- "Modernism and post-modernism: neo-colonial viewpoint—concerning the sources of modernism and post-modernism in the visual arts", Thesis Eleven 38 (1994) 104–117
- "Modernism, post-modernism and the formalesque", Editions 20 (1994) 9–11

== Sources ==
- Peter Beilharz, Imagining the Antipodes: Culture, Theory and the Visual in the Work of Bernard Smith, Melbourne: Cambridge University Press, 1997.
- International Who's Who, London: Europa Publications, 2000
- The Writings of Bernard Smith: Bibliography 1938–1998 (ed. John Spencer and Peter Wright), Sydney: Power Publications, 2000
- The Legacies of Bernard Smith. Essays on Australian Art, History and Cultural Politics (ed. Jaynie Anderson, Christopher Marshall and Andrew Yip), Sydney: Power Publications, 2016
- Sheridan Palmer, Hegel's Owl: The Life of Bernard Smith, Sydney: Power Publications, 2017
- Antipodean Perspective: Selected Writings of Bernard Smith, (ed. Rex Butler and Sheridan Palmer), Melbourne: Monash University Press, 2018
