= Endeavour Reef =

Coral reef in Australia

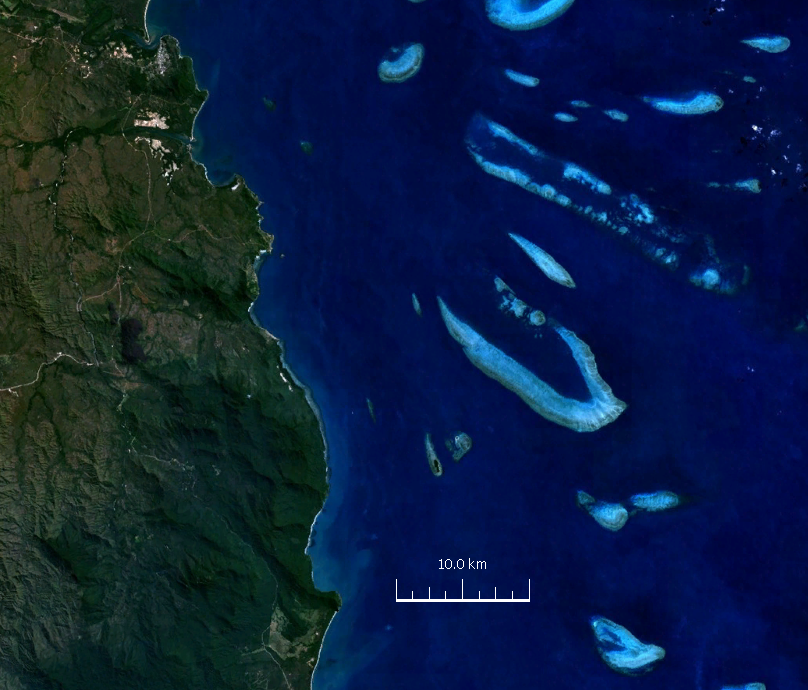

Endeavour Reef is a coral reef within the Great Barrier Reef. It is within the Shire of Cook, Queensland, Australia. On 11 June 1770, the HM Bark Endeavour under the command of Lieutenant James Cook struck the reef and ran aground.

== History ==
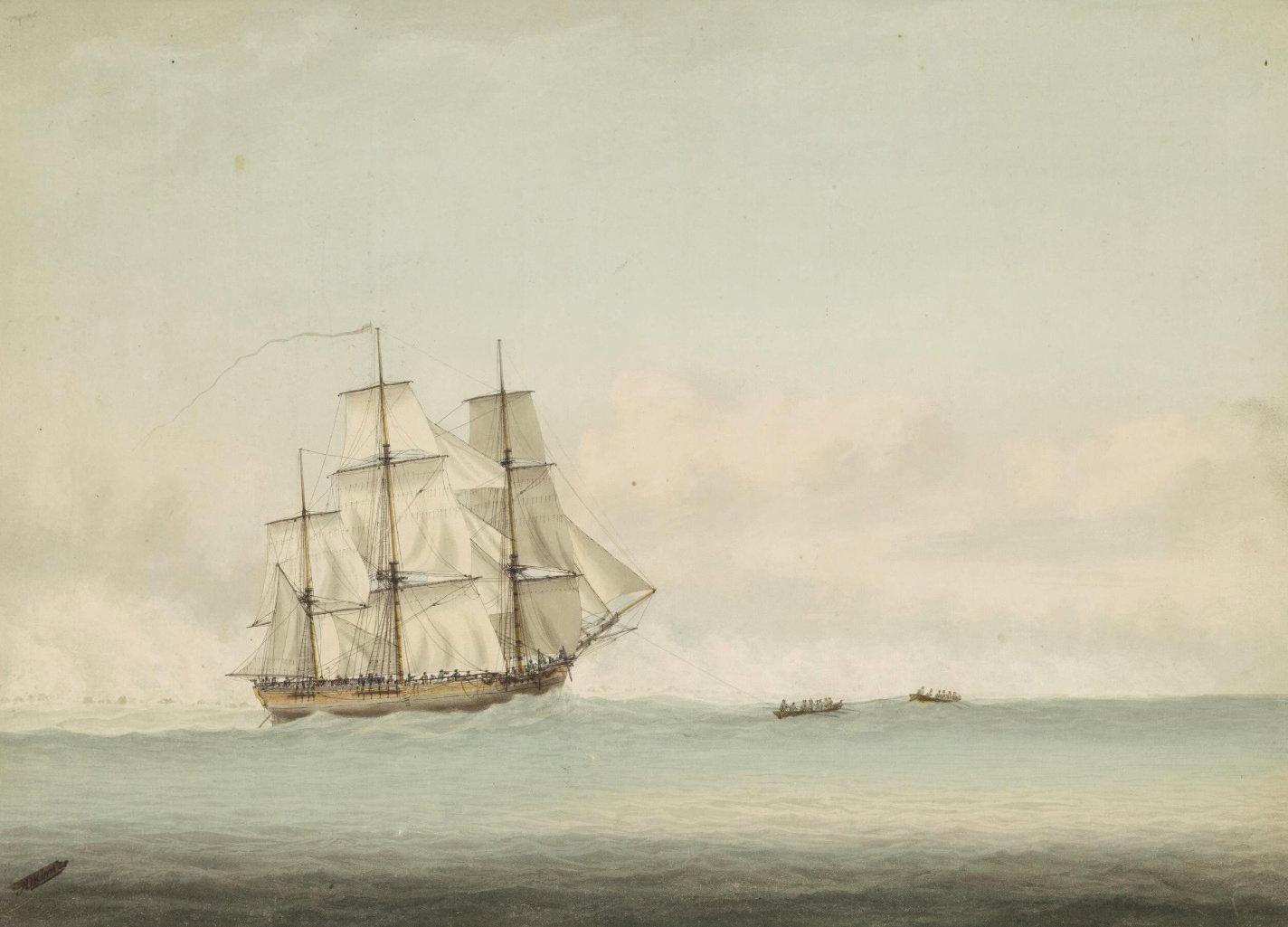
Endeavour aground on the reef in 1770

The reef was encountered by Lieutenant James Cook when HM Bark Endeavour ran aground there on 11 June 1770. In his journals, Cook described striking the south-eastern end of the reef at 11pm after having passed just north of Pickersgill Reef about one hour before. Cook named the reef Endeavour Rocks.

The Endeavour crew discarded six cannons and ballast to refloat the ship. Hans Hass searched unsuccessfully for the cannons during several dives in December 1952. In 1969 an underwater search discovered the six abandoned cannons and ballast.

== Geography ==
The reef is about 7 kilometres (4.3 mi) long and runs in an east–west direction. The center of the reef is located at 15.77806°S 145.58139°E. It is about 6 kilometres (3.7 mi) south-east of the Hope Islands in the Hope Islands National Park and 12 kilometres (7.5 mi) off the mainland.

Philip Parker King described the region in his Voyages for the Survey of the Intertropical coasts of Australia Volume 2 following his expeditions between 1818 and 1820. King described the reef as being "... nine miles long; it lies in a North-West direction; the north end, in 15 degrees 39 minutes South, bears due from the North-east Hope." and stated that there was a dry rock on the western edge "... in latitude 15 degrees 39 minutes 55 seconds." It is probable that he was referring to Cairns Reef which is further to the north.

== Recovered cannons ==
Of the six cannons recovered, they are held by the following museums:

- National Museum of Australia, Canberra, Australia
- Cooktown Museum (formerly James Cook Museum), Cooktown, Australia
- Australian National Maritime Museum, Sydney, Australia
- Te Papa Museum, Auckland, New Zealand
- Royal Museums Greenwich, London, United Kingdom
