= Isabelle Morel =

Swiss writer and translator

Isabelle Morel-Gélieu
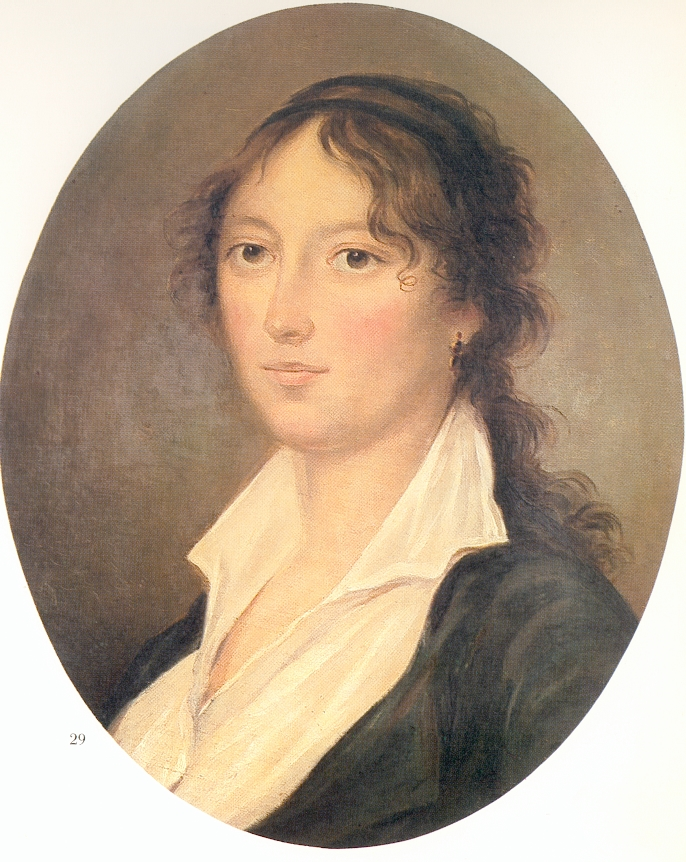
- Isabelle Morel c. 1860; Musée jurassien d'art et d'histoire
- Born: Isabelle de Gélieu; 9 July 1779; Colombier, Lignières, Principality of Neuchâtel
- Died: October 18, 1834 (aged 55); Corgémont
- Citizenship: Swiss
- Occupations: Writer and translator
- Writing career
- Language: German, French
- Period: Age of Enlightenment, Napoleonic Age
- Genres: Biography, Literary criticism
- Notable works: Louise et Albert, ou Le danger d'être trop exigeant

Isabelle Morel (née de Gélieu, 9 July 1779 - 18 October 1834) was a French-speaking Swiss writer, translator and woman of letters who was most notable for her novel Louise et Albert.

== Life ==
Isabelle Morel was born as Isabelle de Gélieu. Her father was Pastor Jonas de Gélieu and mother Marguerite-Isabelle Frêne. She was the granddaughter of diarist and Pastor Théophile-Rémy Frêne. In the local rectory, she learned to read and write and convinced her father, at the age of ten, to teach her the Latin language, the knowledge of which was considered unfeminine in the 18th century. At the age of thirteen, she was sent to Basel to learn German in the boarding house of her aunt, Esther Mieg.

Like Henriette L'Hardy, she was a protégée of Isabelle de Charrière.

== Works ==
- La Nature et l'art. Roman par Mistriss Inchbald. Nouvelle traduction par Mlle de G*** et Mme de C***, Paris 1797 (= Neuchâtel, Louis Fauche-Borel)
- Louise et Albert ou Le Danger d'être trop exigeant, Lausanne, Hignou, 1803, Nouvelle édition Neuchâtel 1999, ISBN 2-88080-005-6
  - Albrecht und Luise, eine schweizerische Erzählung nach dem Französischen der Madame ****. Übersetzung von Ludwig Ferdinand Huber. In Flora, Teutschlands Töchtern geweiht von Freundinnen und Freunden des Schönen Geschlechts, IV (1803), p. 68-170
- Gertrude de Wart ou l’épouse fidèle. Roman historique; traduit de l’allemand de M. Appenzeller, par Mme Morel, Paris, A. Eymery, 1818.
- Manuel des Mères de Pestalozzi, traduit de l’allemand. Genève, J.J. Paschoud, 1821
- Annette et Wilhelm, ou la Constance éprouvée, traduit de l'allemand de Kotzebue, par Mme Morel. Paris, L. Tenré, 1821. 2 vol.
- Choix de pièces fugitives de Schiller, trad. de l'allemand par Mme Morel. Paris, Le Normant père, 1825. nouvelle édition Hachette, 2013.
- Journal 1819-1834. Éd. François Noirjean; Jorge Da Silva, préface Caroline Calame. Neuchâtel, Livréo Alphil, 2020 469 p. ISBN 9782889302529

== Bibliography ==
- 1863 - Fréderic-Alexandre-Marie Jeanneret, James-Henri Bonhôte, Biographie Neuchâteloise, Le Locle, Eugène Courvoisier, 1863, tome 2, p. 123-131.
- 1888 - Samuel Schwab, Biographies erguélistes: Bénédict Alphonse Nicolet de St-Imier, Isabelle Morel-de Gélieu de Corgémont, Nicolas Béguelin de Courtelary. Berne, K.-J. Wyss, 1888. 32 p.
- 1924 - Jules-Émile Hilberer, Une famille jurassienne distinguée: la famille de Gélieu. Actes de la Société jurassienne d'émulation, 1924, Vol.29, p. 27 -49
- 1935 - Ed Freudiger, A propos d'œuvres inédites de Mme Morel de Gélieu. Actes de la Société jurassienne d'émulation, 1935, Vol.40, p. 83 -90
- 1959 - Gabrielle Berthoud, Neuchâteloises du siècle de Voltaire et de Rousseau. In: Musée Neuchâtelois, 46 (1959), p. 97-114.
- 1968 - Henry-Louis Henriod, Une famille neuchâteloise du XVIe au XIXe siècle les Gélieu. Der Schweizer Familienforscher = Le généalogiste suisse, 1 October 1968, Vol.35 (7-9), p. 77-93
- 1971 - Dorette Berthoud, Mme de Charrière et Isabelle de Gélieu, Actes de la Société jurassienne d'Emulation 1971, p. 51-101
- 1973 - Dorette Berthoud, Le Journal d'Isabelle Morel-de Gélieu, Actes de la Société jurassienne d'Emulation 1973, p. 9-50.
- 1974 - Florian Imer, Rose de Gélieu et les siens. Actes de la Société jurassienne d'émulation, 1974, Vol.77, p. 235-356
- 1989 - Alfred Schnegg, Une autre Isabelle. Isabelle de Gélieu. In: Lettre de Zuylen et du Pontet, 14 (1989), p. 3-5.
- 1989 - Susan Klem Jackson, Disengaging Isabelle. Professional rhetoric and female friendship in the correspondence of Mme de Charrière and Mlle de Gélieu.In: Eighteenth-Century Life, 13, (1989), 1, p. 26-41.
- 1994 - Daniel Maggetti, A la frontière de la vie et du roman. La correspondance d'Isabelle de Charrière et d'Isabelle de Gélieu, in Isabelle de Charrière, une Européenne, Isabelle de Charrière en son siècle. Hauterive-Neuchâtel, Gilles Attinger, 1994, p. 255–269
- 1996 - Valérie Cossy, "Nature & Art" d'Elizabeth Inchbald dans la "Bibliothèque Britannique" et dans l’œuvre d'Isabelle de Charrière (1796-1797). Annales Benjamin Constant 18-19 (1996), p. 73-90
- 1998 - Caroline Calame, Isabelle de Gélieu, Femme de lettres, dans Biographies Neuchâteloises, tome 2, Hauterive 1998 p. 122-127
- 1999 - Caroline Calame, Commentaire à propos de la réédition de « Louise et Albert », Neuchâtel 1999
- 1999 - Caroline Calame, A propos de la réédition de Louise et Albert ou le danger d'être trop exigeant d'Isabelle de Gélieu. In: Lettre de Zuylen et du Pontet, 24 (1999), p. 17-18.
- 2001 - Maud Dubois, Le roman sentimental en Suisse romande (1780-1830). In: Annales Benjamin Constant. 25 (2001), p. 161-246. (Note: Analysis: includes Isabelle de Gélieu's novel "Louise et Albert")
- 2004 - Yvette Went-Daoust, Correspondance des deux Isabelle. Réalité et fiction. In: Lettre de Zuylen et du Pontet, 29 (2004), p. 4-8.
- 2014 - François Noirjean, Le journal d'Isabelle Morel-De Gélieu 1819-1834. In: Revue historique neuchâteloise, 151(2014) no 1–2, p. 43-59
- 2020 - Maxim Nougé, Entretien avec François Noirjean sur le livre Isabelle Morel-De Gélieu. Journal (1819-1834). Magazine historique. Le Quotidien Jurassien. 8 juin 2020.
- 2021 - Laurent Tissot, Sylvane Messerli, Claude Hauser, Un foyer intellectuel et artistique dans le Jura bernois, 1780-1850, Charles-Ferdinand Morel et Isabelle Morel-de Gélieu. Neuchâtel, Alphil-Presses universitaires suisses, 2021.
