= Zuilen =

District of Utrecht, the Netherlands

Coordinates: 52.1272°N 5.0694°E

Zuilen within the city of Utrecht.

The flag of zuilen.

The crest of zuilen.

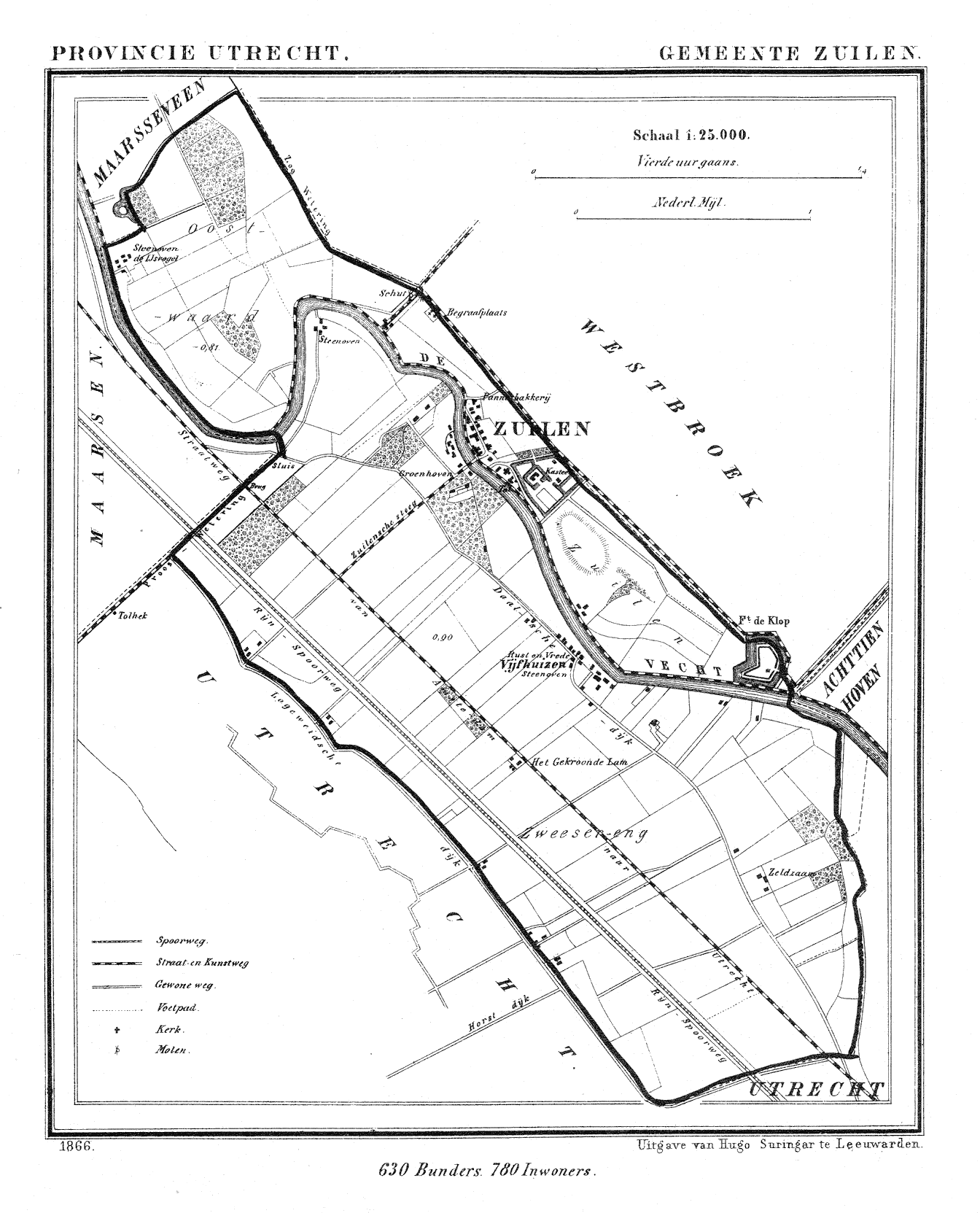
Zuilen in 1866

Zuilen is a district in the Northwest section of the Dutch city of Utrecht.

Zuilen is bordered by the train line and the river Vecht, the Amsterdam-Rhine Canal, the street Marnixlaan, and the city borders at the north. The neighborhood Elinkwijk, located in Zuilen, contains the protected city view Beschermd Stadsgezicht Zuilen-Elinkwijk. Buildings within this area are not automatically protected monuments, but the city government will monitor and adjust zoning and planning in the area to protect the look of the area.

== History ==
Zuilen used to be a municipality in the Dutch province of Utrecht. It existed until 1954, when it split in two parts. The southern part merged with Utrecht to form the district that is now known as Zuilen. Oud-Zuilen merged with Maarssen, which merged with other municipalities to form Stichtse Vecht on Januari 1st 2011.

In 1510 the Zuylen Castle was established, where Isabelle de Charrière (1740–1805) was born and lived in summer and in winter in the city of Utrecht, till she married in 1771.

Zuylen castle has been open to the public since 1952.
