= Marie Therese Forster =

Marie Therese Forster may refer to:

- Marie Therese Forster (1764–1829), wife of Georg Forster, known as Therese Forster or under her second married name Therese Huber
- Marie Therese Forster (1786–1864), daughter of Georg Forster and his wife Therese, known as Therese Forster
