= Oud-Zuilen =

- Village
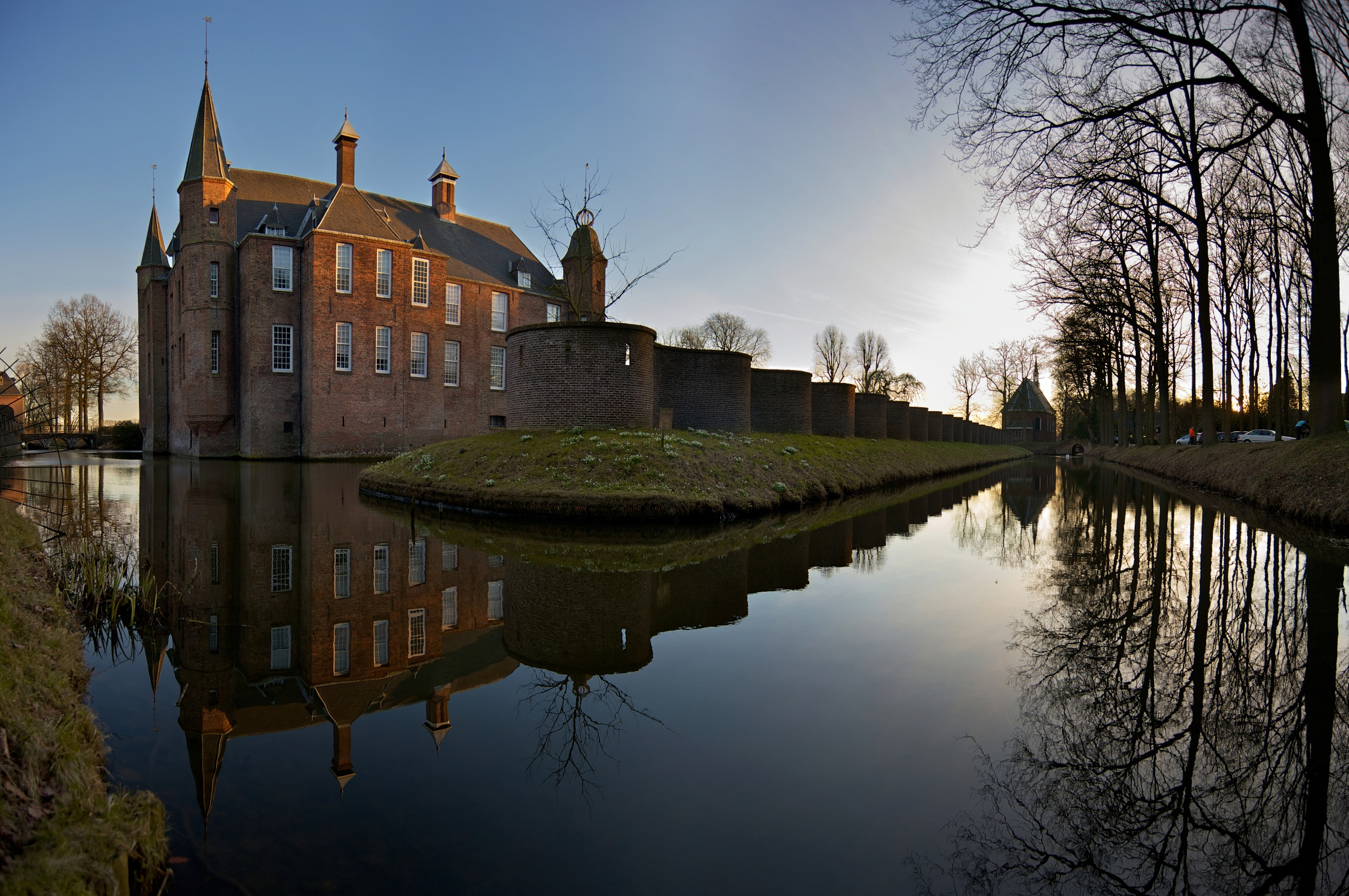
- Zuylen Castle

- Location in the Netherlands Oud-Zuilen (Netherlands)
- Coordinates: 52°7′38″N 5°4′10″E
- Country: Netherlands
- Province: Utrecht
- Municipality: Stichtse Vecht

Area
  - Total: 1.51 km^{2} (0.58 sq mi)
- Elevation: 0.8 m (2.6 ft)

Population (2021)
  - Total: 600
  - Density: 400/km^{2} (1,000/sq mi)
- Time zone: UTC+1 (CET)
  - Summer (DST): UTC+2 (CEST)
- Postal code: 3611
- Dialing code: 030

Oud-Zuilen is a village in the Dutch province of Utrecht. It is a part of the municipality of Stichtse Vecht, and lies about 4 km northwest of Utrecht. It is in an area called the "Vechtstreek". Zuylen Castle is located in the village.

== History ==
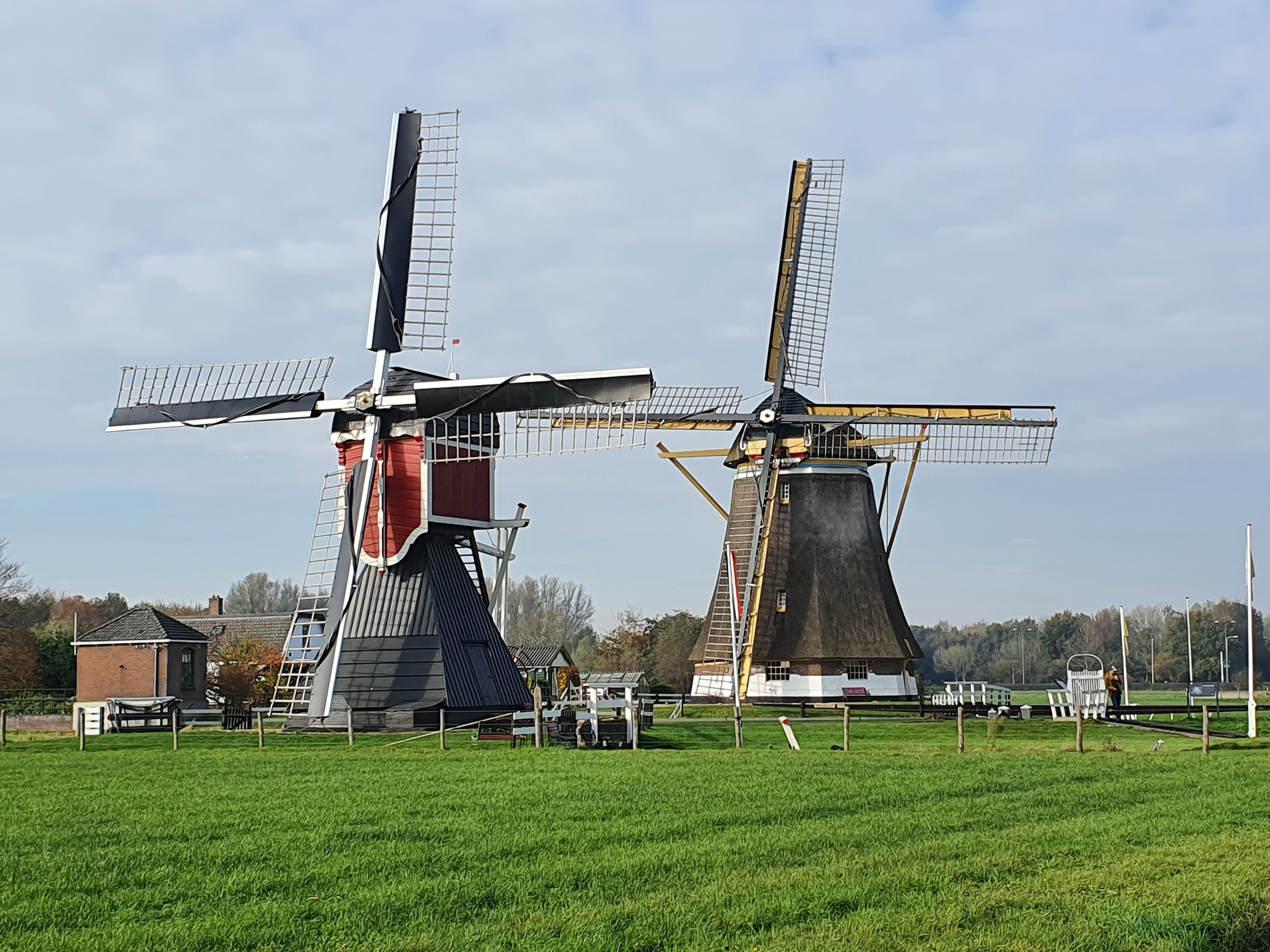
Windmills in Oud-Zuilen

The village was first mentioned in 1200 as Sulen and maybe in 1169 as well. The etymology is unclear. It is called Oud (old) to distinguish from Zuilen which is nowadays a neighbourhood of the city of Utrecht. Oud-Zuilen started as a little village probably near the castle.

Zuylen Castle dates from at least 1178, and the wooden castle Tule from 883 could have been its predecessor. The van Borselen family who owned the castle were in dispute with the city of Utrecht, and the castle was destroyed in 1422 by angry citizens. In 1520, the castle was rebuilt. The current castle dates from the 18th century and is now a museum.

A chapel in Oud-Zuilen was first mentioned in 1050. The Dutch Reformed Church was built in 1654, but lost in a fire in 1847, however some parts like the cartouches were salvaged. In 1840, Oud-Zuilen was home to 318 people. In 1954, the municipality was dissolved. Oud-Zuilen and the hamlet Oostwaard were transferred to Maarssen, and the remainder became a neighbourhood of Utrecht.

There are two wind mills in Oud-Zuilen. The Westbroekse Molen is a polder mill from 1753. In 1947, a Diesel engine was installed to pump the excess water, however it frequently failed. The pumping station Van Eijkgemaal was built between 1970 and 1971 as a replacement, and the wind mill was sold in 1974. In 1983, it was restored and has been recommissioned as a backup system. The Buitenwegse Molen dates from 1830, and is a so-called wipmolen. It was also in use as a polder mill, and remained a backup after the pumping station was built. In 2016, it was severely damaged by fire, and restored in 2017-2018.

== Gallery ==
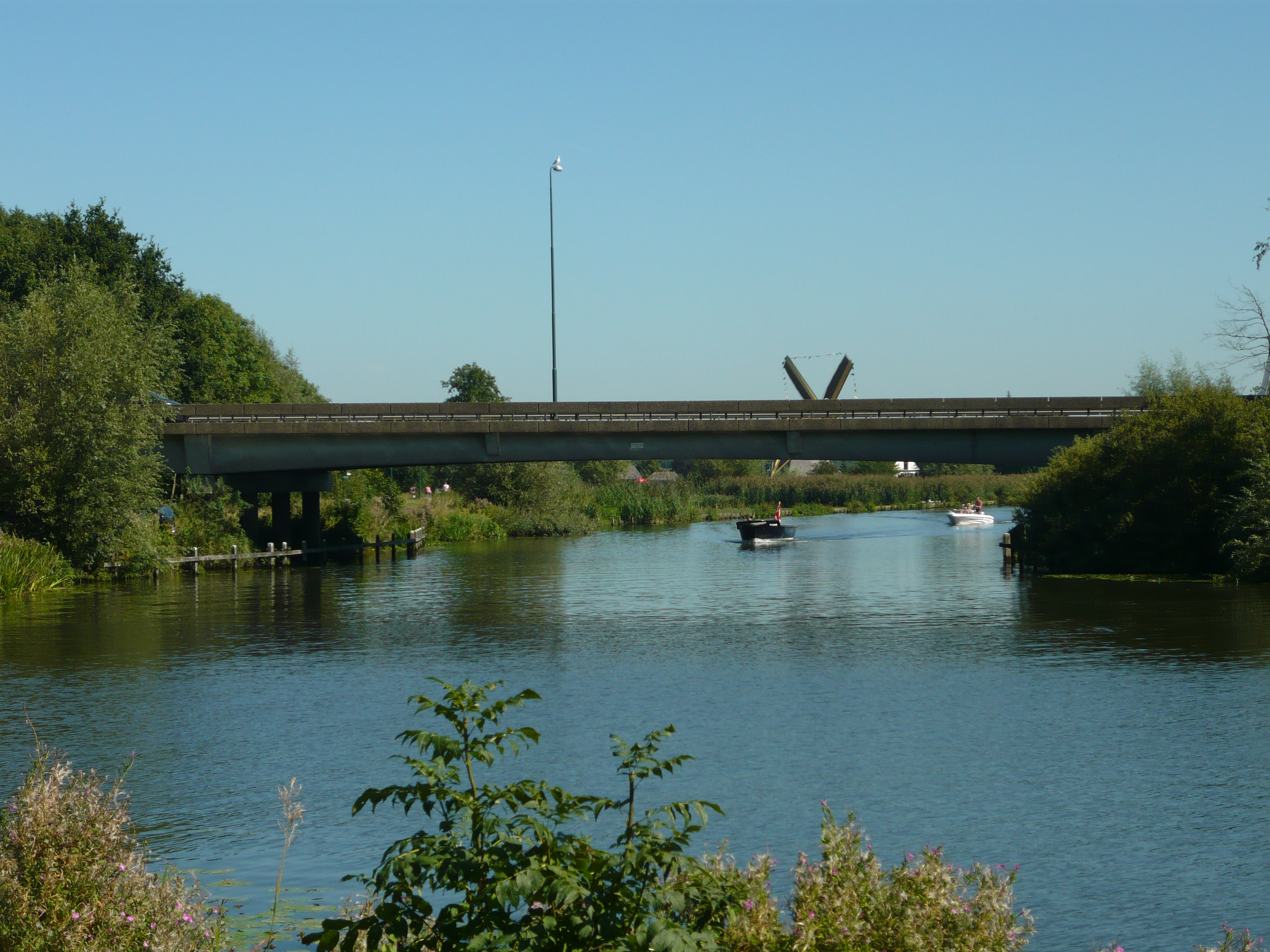
Bridge over the Vecht

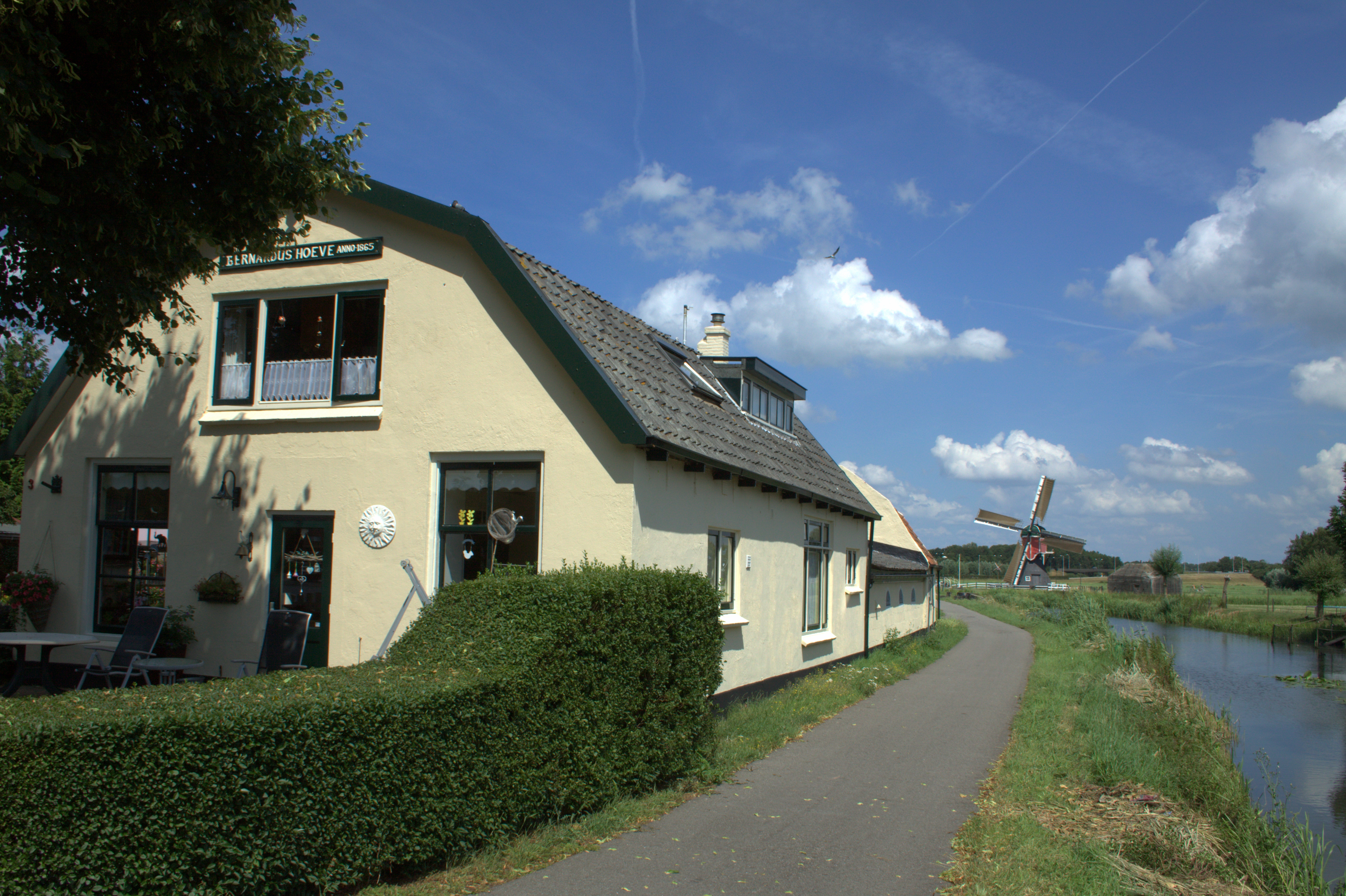
Farm in Oud-Zuilen

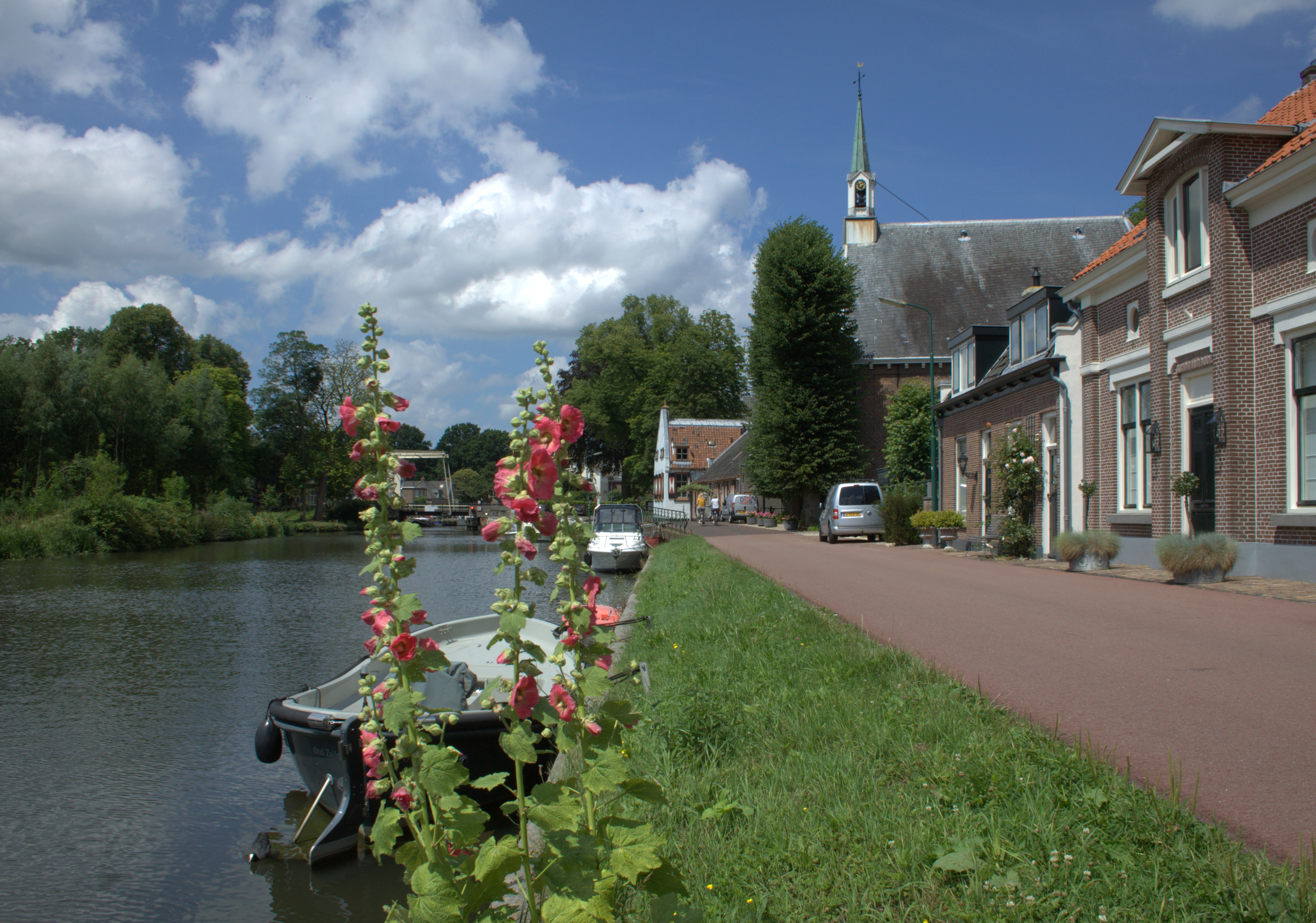
Village view
