= Georg Gottfried Gervinus =

19th-century German historian and politician

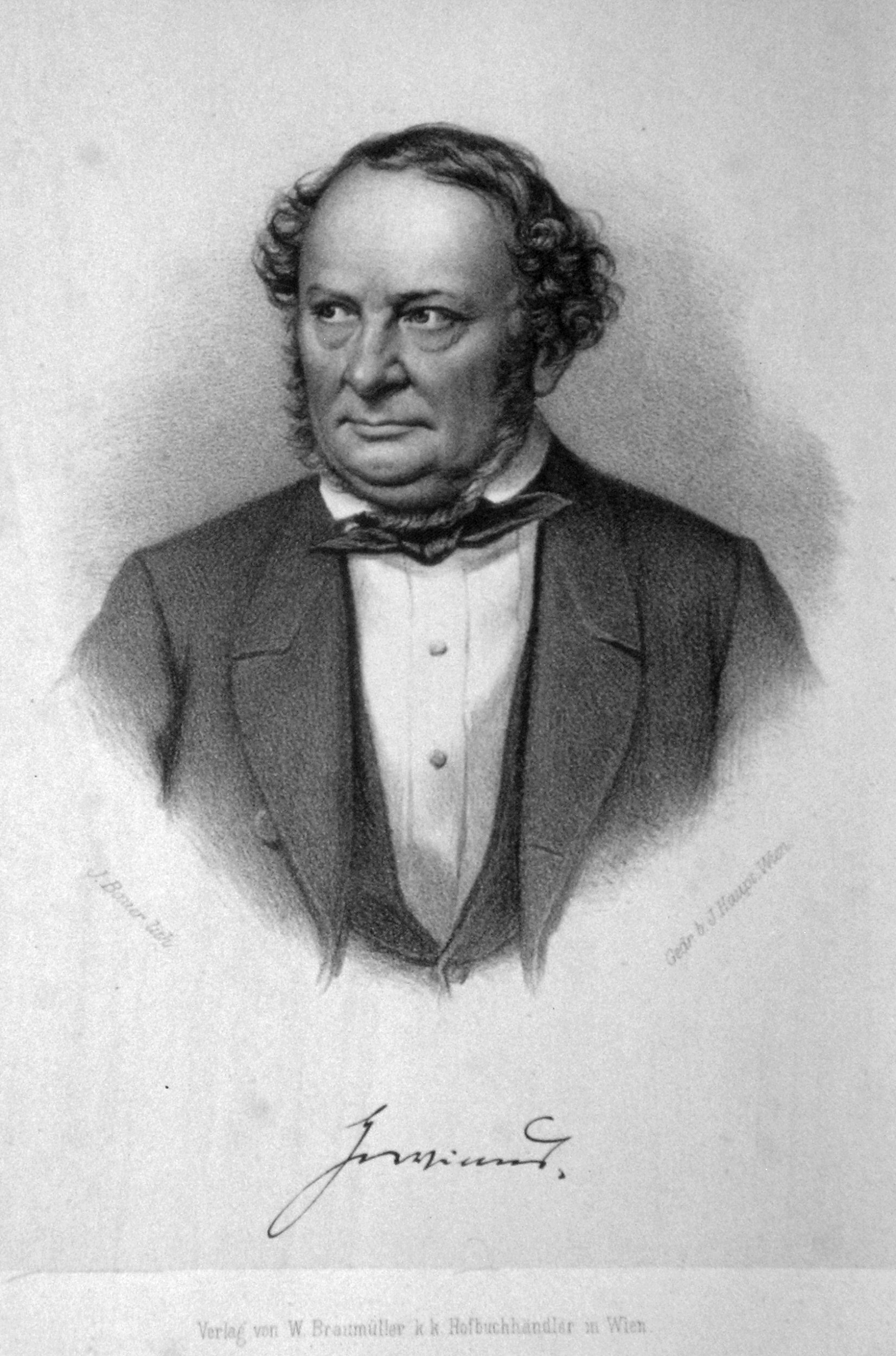
Gervinus in a lithograph by Joseph Anton Bauer

Georg Gottfried Gervinus (20 May 1805 – 18 March 1871) was a German literary and political historian.

== Biography ==
Gervinus was born in Darmstadt. He was educated at the gymnasium of the town, and intended for a commercial career, but in 1825 he became a student of the university of Giessen. In 1826 he went to Heidelberg, where he attended the lectures of the historian Schlosser, who became henceforth his guide and his model. In 1828 he was appointed teacher at a private school at Frankfurt am Main, and in 1830 Privatdozent at Heidelberg. In this period he became a friend of the young historian Karl von Hegel (the son of the philosopher Georg Wilhelm Friedrich Hegel) and of the jurist Georg Beseler.

A volume of his collected Historische Schriften procured him the appointment of professor extraordinarius; while the first volume of his Geschichte der poetischen Nationallitteratur der Deutschen (History of the poetical national literature of the Germans; 1835–1842, 5 vols.) subsequently entitled Geschichte der deutschen Dichtung (History of German poetry; 5th edition, by Karl Bartsch, 1871–1874) brought him the appointment to a regular professorship of history and literature at Göttingen. This work is the first comprehensive history of German literature written both with scholarly erudition and literary skill. In the following year he wrote his Grundzüge der Historik, which is perhaps the most thoughtful of his philosophico-historical productions.

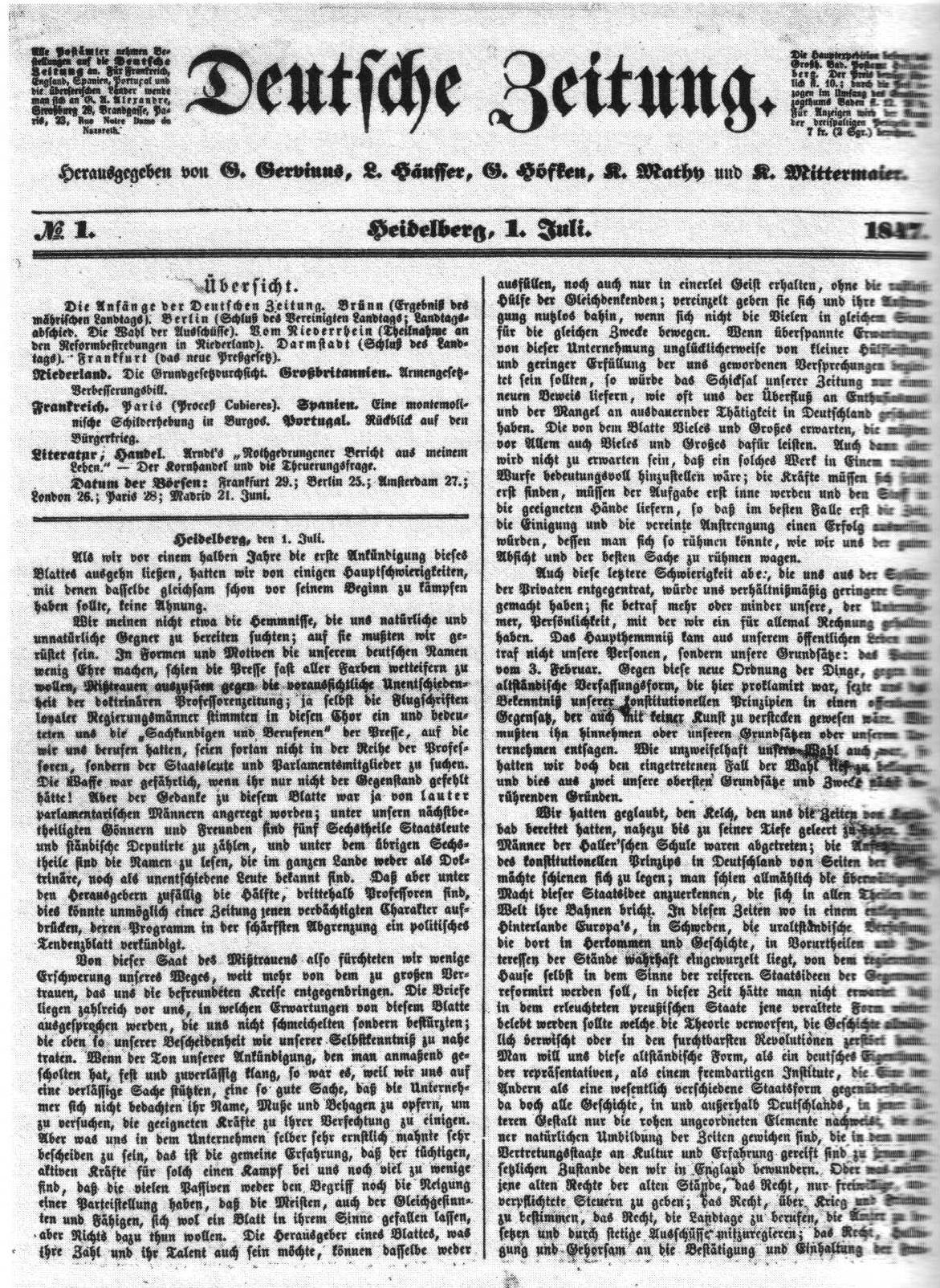
First issue of July 1, 1847, of Deutsche Zeitung, a liberal daily issued founded by Georg Gottfried.

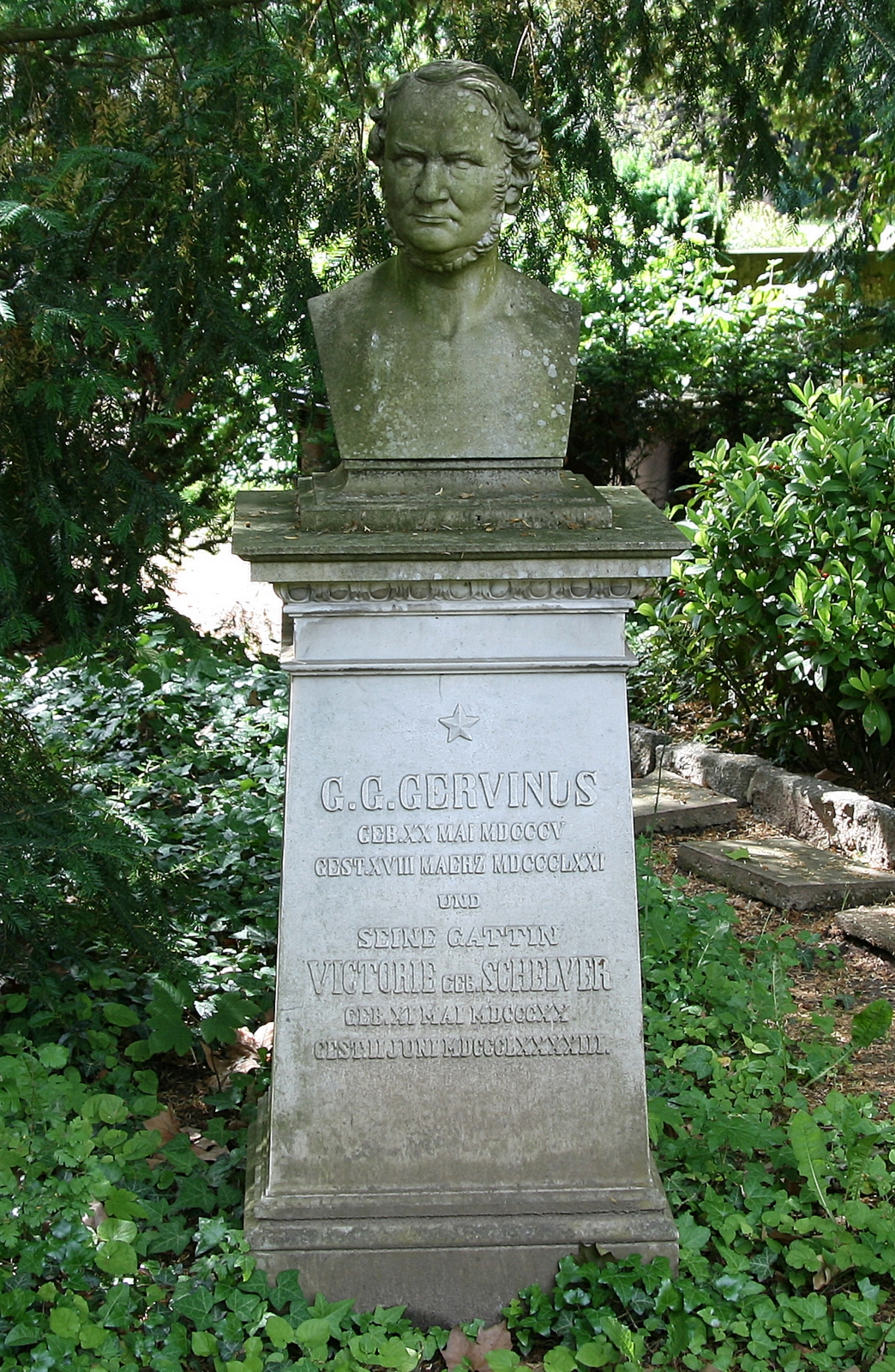
His grave in Heidelberg

The same year brought his expulsion from Göttingen in consequence of his protest, in conjunction with six of his colleagues, against the violation of the constitution by Ernest Augustus, king of Hanover and duke of Cumberland. After several years in Heidelberg, Darmstadt and Rome, he settled permanently in Heidelberg, where, in 1844, he was appointed honorary professor. He zealously took up in the following year the cause of the German Catholics, hoping it would lead to a union of all the Christian confessions, and to the establishment of a national church. He also came forward in 1846 as a patriotic champion of the Schleswig-Holsteiners, and when, in 1847, King Frederick William IV promulgated the royal decree for summoning the so-called United Diet (German: Vereinigter Landtag), Gervinus hoped that this event would form the basis of the constitutional development of the largest German state. He founded, together with some other patriotic scholars, the Deutsche Zeitung, which certainly was one of the best-written political journals ever published in Germany. His appearance in the political arena secured his election as deputy for the Prussian province of Saxony to the National Assembly sitting in 1848 at Frankfurt. Disgusted with the failure of that body, he retired from all active political life.

In 1839/40, Gervinus approached Therese Forster, the daughter of German explorer, writer and revolutionary Georg Forster, and suggested an edition of her father's complete works to be published by Brockhaus in Leipzig, with a biographic introduction by Gervinus. The nine-volume edition appeared in 1843 and remained the prevailing edition of Georg Forster's works for more than a century.

Gervinus now devoted himself to literary and historical studies, and between 1849 and 1852 published his work on Shakespeare (4 vols., 4th ed. 2 vols., 1872; Eng. trans. by F. E. Bunnett, 1863, new ed. 1877). He also revised his History of German Literature, for a fourth edition (1853), and began at the same time to plan his Geschichte des neunzehnten Jahrhunderts (8 vols., 1854–1860), which was preceded by an Einleitung in die Geschichte des neunzehnten Jahrhunderts (1853).

The latter work caused some stir in the literary and political world, owing to the circumstance that the government of Baden imprudently instituted a prosecution against the author for high treason. Arraigned before a tribunal, Gervinus defended himself with a great display of ability and courage, but was nevertheless condemned to an imprisonment of two months, and all the copies of the "seditious publication" were to be destroyed. However, the verdict was rescinded by a higher tribunal. Afterward, Gervinus buried himself still more among his books, and even forebore to deliver lectures.

In 1856, the Händel-Gesellschaft society was founded by Gervinus and the German music historian and critic Friedrich Chrysander. The aim of the society was to publish the collected works of Georg Frideric Handel.

In 1868 appeared Händel und Shakespeare, zur Asthetik der Tonkunst, in which he drew an ingenious parallel between his favorite poet and his favorite composer, showing that their intellectual affinity was based on the Teutonic origin common to both, on their analogous intellectual development and character. The ill-success of this publication, and the indifference with which the latter volumes of his History of the 19th Century were received by his countrymen, together with the feeling of disappointment that the unity of Germany had been brought about in another fashion and by other means than he wished to see employed, embittered his later years, though it did not sour his kindly and humane disposition, nor did it in the least affect his sociable temper, and he cultivated refined society to the last. He died in Heidelberg on 18 March 1871.

Gervinus was a close friend of Georg Friedrich Fallenstein, the father of Helene Fallenstein, who would become the mother of the famous scholar, Max Weber. In her biography of Weber, Marianne Weber, his wife, writes that Helene was sexually molested and probably raped by Gervinus, who was living upstairs in the Fallenstein household after Fallenstein's death. The biography describes Gervinus as a "fatherly friend" of Fallenstein's daughters who regularly read Homer to the girls in their youth. "When she [Helene] was 16," Marianne Weber writes, "a chaste, closed bud of a girl, Gervinus, whom she respected as a teacher, loved like a father, and had trusted for years, one day lost control of himself. The aging man suddenly engulfed the unsuspecting girl with the searing heat of a passion beyond control. She was torn by horror, disgust, pity, and her old grateful devotion to her fatherly friend and teacher. Because her nerves were delicate, she came close to a breakdown. Helene never got over this shock. From that moment on she regarded physical passion as guilt-laden and sub-human. Even when she was an old woman, the memory of that experience would bring an expression of horror to her face." Soon thereafter, the biography continues, Helene met Max Weber Sr. Engagement soon followed, and Helene subsequently described their marriage (which over time would become an unhappy one) as having saved her from the trauma of the Gervinus assault.

He was a critic of Otto van Bismarck and of the manner in which German unification happened.

== Works ==
Geschichte der deutschen Dichtung was the first comprehensive history of German poetry in a connected form. The author represented the literary activity of Germany in its successive stages as it grew out of her political life, thus making political history the foil and basis of literary history. His judgment was sincere and independent, although his criticism often assumed a censorious and pedantic tone against the most prominent poets of Germany, for example Goethe, Schiller and Jean Paul. Notwithstanding this criticism, the German people, without allowing themselves to be misguided in their judgment regarding the merits of these poets, gratefully accepted his work as a national homage to the subject.

Geschichte der deutschen Dichtung introduced the German composer Richard Wagner to the 16th century poet and musician Hans Sachs and the musical guilds of Nuremberg. It was an important influence on Wagner's opera Die Meistersinger von Nürnberg (The Mastersingers of Nuremberg).

The object of Gervinus in writing this literary history was also a patriotic one. He endeavoured to show that Germany, having already attained great eminence in literature, should henceforth exclusively devote herself to political activity, and surpass other nations also in this respect.

He had a no less patriotic object in view in writing his commentary on Shakespeare, which was made popular in England by a translation. This work is not so much a philological or aesthetical commentary as a treatise pointing out the ethical or moral precepts which may be deduced from Shakespeare's productions, and this circumstance makes it of considerable value and interest also to English readers. Gervinus, who considered Shakespeare the intellectual property of Germany, in the same way as he considered Handel the artistic property of England, wished above all to inculcate on his countrymen the teachings of healthy practical activity to be found in the works of the English dramatist. The object for which he wrote, that is the moral improvement of his readers from a practical point of view, seemed to him the easier to be accomplished through the productions of Shakespeare, because the poet was descended from a kindred race, and the fructifying seeds of his thoughts and sentiments, falling upon a congenial soil, would be sure to take root there kindly.

As a political historian, Gervinus was the antipode of Ranke. Following the principles of F. C. Schlosser, he slighted all documentary history. He had such a deep distrust of all state papers and diplomatic documents that he considered them as most untrustworthy sources for any historical record. He confined himself, therefore, chiefly to taking into account the political events and their results just as they lay on the surface; and, not consulting the state archives for the secret springs which set them in motion, he based his historical narratives almost entirely on his subjective judgment. Many brilliant passages will be found in his general History of the 19th Century, such as the accounts of the South American and Greek revolutions, and of the July revolution in 1830; and his Historische Schriften also contain a number of valuable treatises and essays, which may be said to have paved the way to a new era in the art of writing history.

Gervinus entertained a kindly feeling towards England, which he called the land of political mastery; and though he was rather a cosmopolitan, he nevertheless remained a German patriot to the core. Ranke's opinion was "that he will never be forgotten."

== Bibliography ==
Gervinus's autobiography (G. G. Gervinus Leben, von ihm selbst) was published by his widow in 1893. It does not, however, go beyond the year 1836. See E. Lehmann, Gervinus, Versuch einer Charakteristik (1871); R. Gosche, Gervinus (1871); J. Dörfel, Gervinus als historischer Denker (1904).
