= Isabelle de Charrière =

Dutch and Swiss writer (1740–1805)

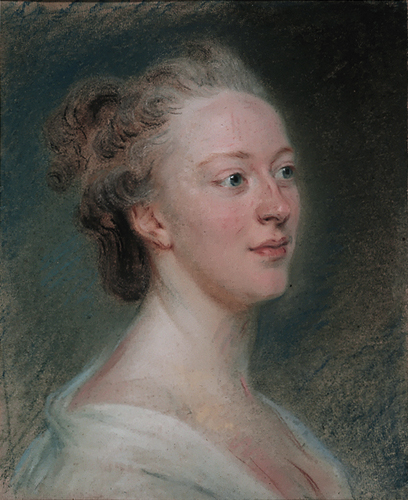
- Isabelle de Charrière by Maurice-Quentin de La Tour 1766, Musée d'Art et d'Histoire (Geneva).
- Born: Isabella Agneta Elisabeth van Tuyll van Serooskerken; 20 October 1740; Castle Zuylen, Utrecht, Netherlands
- Died: 27 December 1805 (aged 65); Le Pontet, Colombier, Principality of Neuchâtel
- Occupations: Novelist; poet; playwright
- Writing career
- Pen name: Belle van Zuylen; Belle de Zuylen; Zélide; Abbé de la Tour
- Website: www.charriere.nl www.belle-van-zuylen.eu

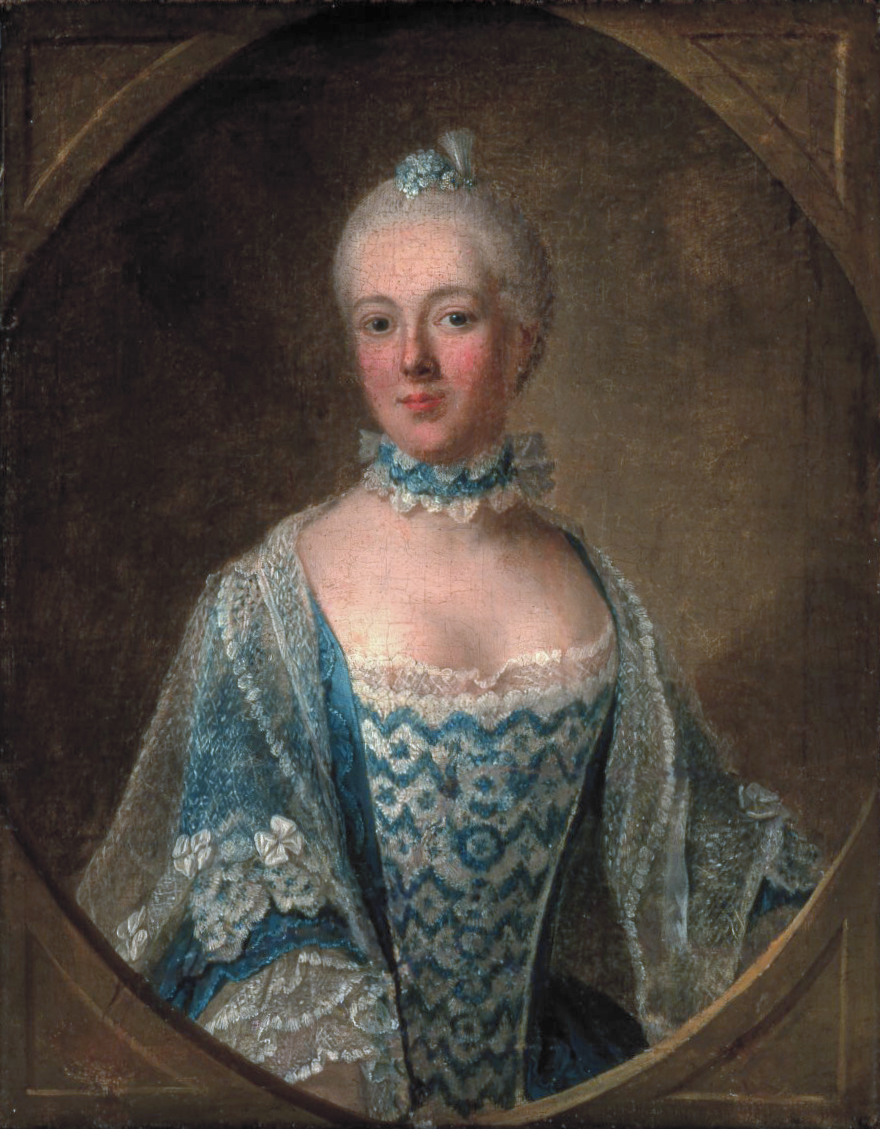
Belle de Zuylen by Guillaume de Spinny 1759.

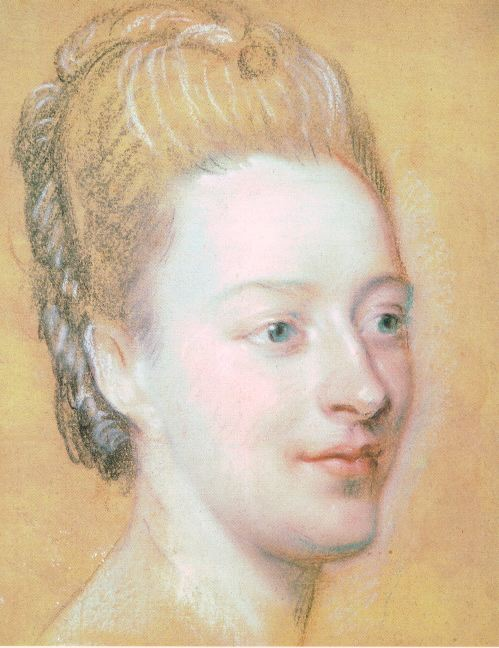
Portrait of Isabelle de Charrière by Maurice-Quentin de La Tour (1771). Musée Antoine-Lécuyer, Saint-Quentin, Aisne, France.

Isabelle's father Diederik Jacob van Tuyll van Serooskerken (1707–1776), a Dutch politician.

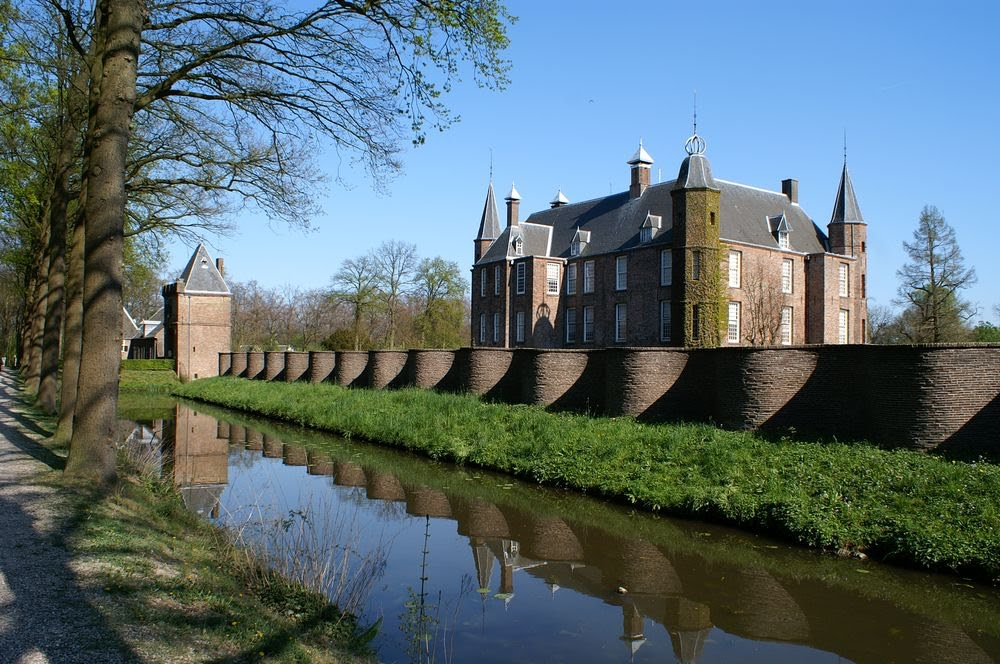
Zuylen Castle with serpentine wall.

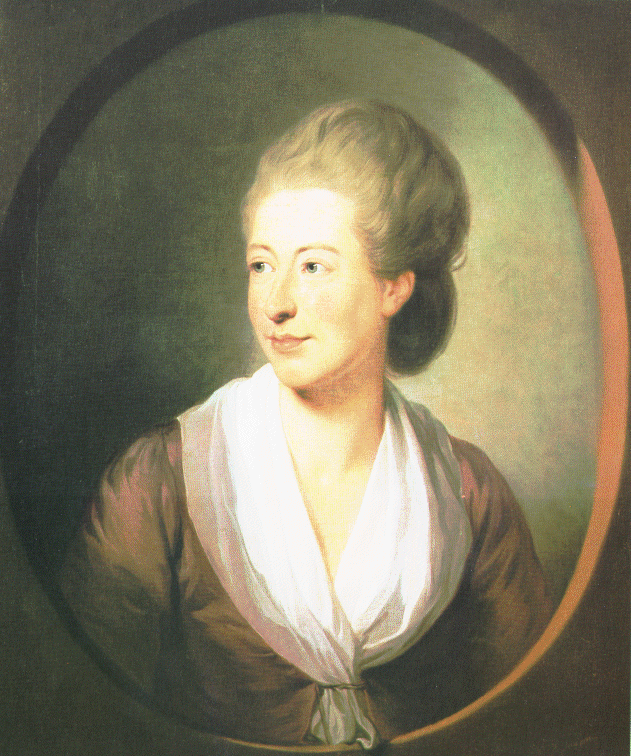
Isabelle de Charrière by Jens Juel (1777) Musée d'Art et d'Histoire (Neuchâtel).

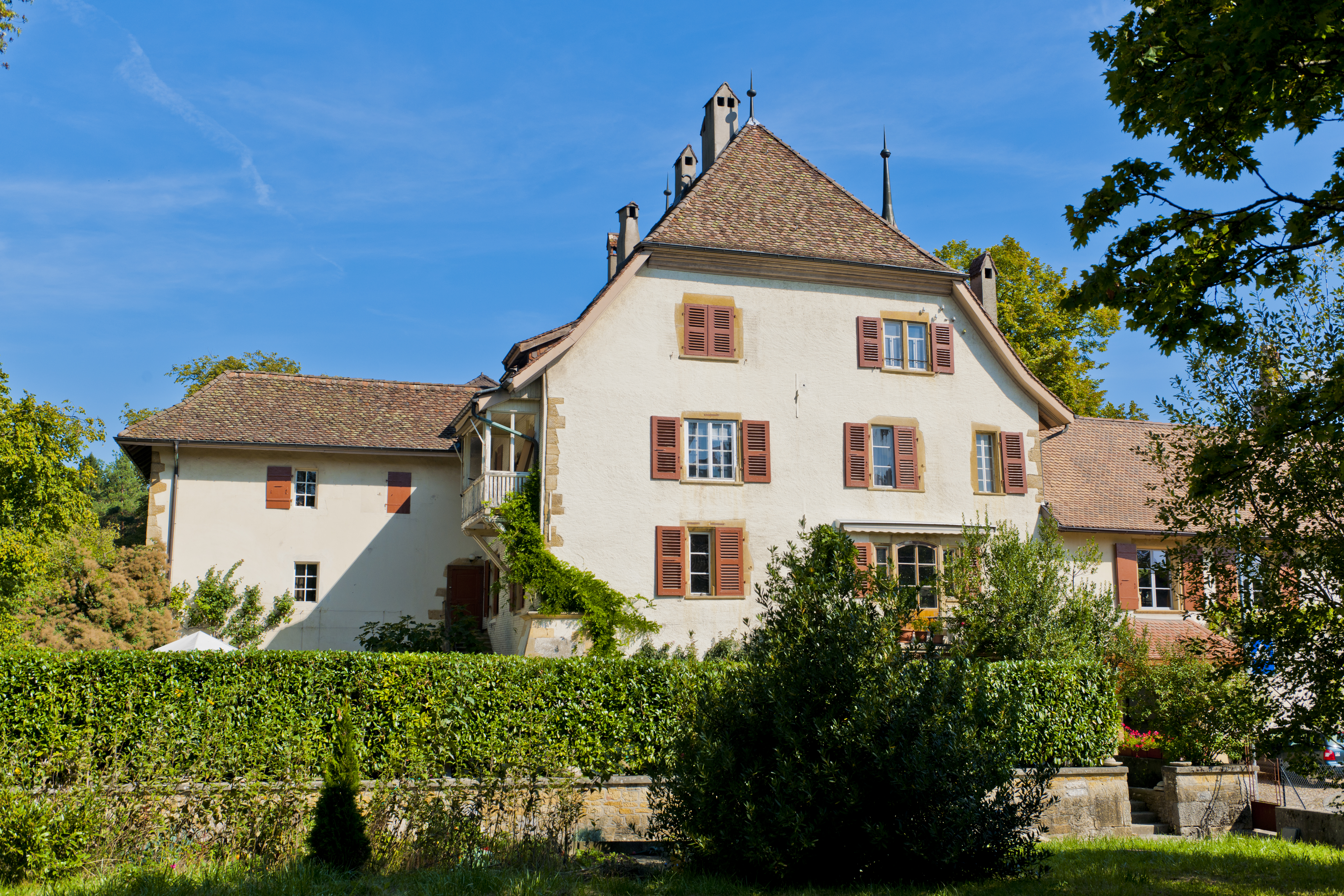
Le Pontet, Colombier, Neuchâtel, Switzerland.

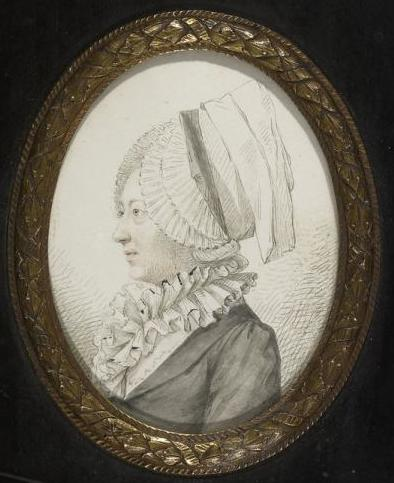
Isabelle de Charrière 1781.

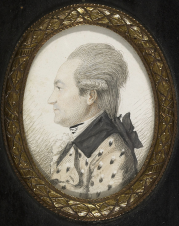
Charles-Emmanuel de Charrière 1781.

Isabelle de Charrière (French: [izabɛl də ʃaʁjɛʁ]; née Isabella Agneta Elisabeth van Tuyll van Serooskerken; 20 October 1740 – 27 December 1805), also known as Madame de Charrière and in the Netherlands as Belle van Zuylen (Dutch: [ˈbɛlə vɑn ˈzœylə(n)]), was a Dutch and Swiss writer of the Enlightenment who lived the latter half of her life in Colombier, Neuchâtel, Principality of Neuchâtel. She is now best known for her letters and novels, although she also wrote pamphlets, music and plays. She took a keen interest in the society and politics of her age, and her work around the time of the French Revolution is regarded as being of particular interest.

== Early life ==
Isabelle van Tuyll van Serooskerken was born in Zuylen Castle in Zuilen near Utrecht in the Netherlands, to Diederik Jacob van Tuyll van Serooskerken (1706–1776), and Jacoba Helena de Vicq (1724–1768). She was the eldest of seven children. Her parents were described by the Scots author James Boswell, then a student in law in Utrecht and one of her suitors, as "one of the most ancient noblemen in the Seven Provinces" and "an Amsterdam lady, with a great deal of money". In winter they lived in their house in the city of Utrecht.

In 1750, Isabelle was sent to Geneva and travelled through Switzerland and France with her French-speaking governess Jeanne-Louise Prevost, who was her teacher from 1746-1753. Having spoken only French for a year, she had to relearn Dutch on returning home to the Netherlands. However, French would remain her preferred language for the rest of her life, which helps to explain why, for a long time, her work was not as well known in her country of birth as it otherwise might have been.

Isabelle enjoyed a much broader education than was usual for girls at that time, thanks to the liberal views of her parents who also let her study subjects like mathematics, physics and languages including Latin, Italian, German and English. By all accounts, she was a gifted student. Always interested in music, in 1790 she began studying with composer Niccolò Zingarelli.

At the age of 14 years she fell in love with the Roman Catholic Polish count Peter Dönhoff. He was not interested in her. Disappointed, she left Utrecht for 18 months. As she grew older, various suitors appeared on the scene only to be rejected because they promised to visit her, but did not, or to withdraw themselves because she was superior. She saw marriage as a way to gain freedom but she also wanted to marry for love.

Invited specially by Anne Pollexfen Drake and also her husband lieutenant general George Eliott to come to their London home in Curzon Street, Mayfair, Isabelle did come by boat from Hellevoetsluis to Harwich 7 November 1766 accompanied by her brother Ditie, her maid Doortje and her valet Vitel.

== Later life ==
In 1771, she married Charles-Emmanuel de Charrière de Penthaz (1735–1808) and was then known as Isabelle de Charrière. M. de Charrière, born in Colombier, near Neuchâtel, had been the private tutor of her brother Willem René abroad from 1763 to 1766. The couple settled at Le Pontet in Colombier, bought by his grandfather Béat Louis de Muralt, with her father-in-law François (1697–1780) and her two unmarried sisters-in-law Louise (1731–1810) and Henriette (1740–1814). The Principality of Neuchâtel was then ruled by Frederick the Great as prince of Neuchâtel in personal union with Prussia. Neuchâtel enjoyed freedom of religion which resulted in the arrival of many refugees including Jean-Jacques Rousseau, Béat Louis de Muralt and David Wemyss, Lord Elcho. The couple also spent significant amounts of time in Geneva and Paris.

De Charrière became rich by modern standards in 1778 by partly inheriting the fortunes of her parents, including for nearly 40% investments in the colonial compagnies such as the Dutch West India Company (WIC), Dutch East India Company (VOC), the British East India Company and the South Sea Company depending on profitable overseas slavery in plantations. According to the opinion of Drieënhuizen and Douze in their publication of 2021 in her letters and in her novel Trois Femmes (Three Women, 1795–1798) De Charrière mentioned slavery uncritically. However, the opposite was the case while she wrote about what she called the horrors (horreurs) in the colonies in a letter (number 1894, of 1798, so she was not indifferent to excesses of slavery, as was detailed by the editor of her correspondence Suzan van Dijk. Within five years after her inheritance De Charrière sold 70% of her colonial investments.

== Correspondence ==
Isabelle de Charrière kept up an extensive correspondence with numerous people, including intellectuals like David-Louis Constant d'Hermenches, James Boswell, Benjamin Constant and her German translator Ludwig Ferdinand Huber.

In 1760, Isabelle met David-Louis Constant d'Hermenches (1722–1785), a married Swiss officer regarded in society as a Don Juan. After much hesitation, Isabelle's need for self-expression overcame her scruples and, after a second meeting two years later, she began an intimate and secret correspondence with him for about 15 years. Constant d'Hermenches was to be one of her most important correspondents.

The Scottish writer James Boswell met her frequently in Utrecht and in Castle Zuylen in 1763-1764, when he studied law at the Utrecht University. He called her Zélide, like in her self portrait. He became a regular correspondent for several years after leaving the Netherlands, going on Grand Tour. He wrote her that he was not in love with her. She replied: "We agree, because I have no talent for subordination". In 1766 he did send a conditional proposal to her father after meeting her brother in Paris, but the fathers did not agree to a marriage.

In 1786, Mme de Charrière met Constant d'Hermenches' nephew, the writer Benjamin Constant, in Paris. He visited her in Colombier several times. There they wrote an epistolary novel together, and an exchange of letters began that would last until the end of her life. She also had an interesting correspondence with her young friends Henriette L'Hardy and Isabelle Morel. Huber's young stepdaughter Therese Forster lived with her from 1801 until Isabelle de Charrière's death.

== Works ==
Isabelle de Charrière wrote novels, pamphlets, plays, and poems and composed music. Her most productive period came only after she had been living in Colombier for a number of years. Themes included her religious doubts, the nobility and the upbringing of women.

Her first novel, Le Noble, was published in 1763. It was a satire against the nobility and although it was published anonymously, her identity was soon discovered and her parents withdrew the work from sale. Then she wrote a portrait of herself for her friends: Portrait de Mll de Z., sous le nom de Zélide, fait par elle-même. 1762. In 1784 she published two fictional works, Lettres neuchâteloises and Lettres de Mistriss Henley publiées par son amie. Both were epistolary novels, a form she continued to favour. In 1788, she published her first pamphlets about the political situation in the Netherlands, France and Switzerland.

An admirer of the philosopher Jean-Jacques Rousseau, she assisted in the posthumous publication of his Confessions in 1789. She also wrote her own pamphlets on Rousseau around this time.

The French Revolution caused a number of nobles to flee to Neuchâtel and Mme de Charrière befriended some of them. But she also published works criticising the attitudes of the aristocratic refugees, most of whom she thought had learned nothing from the Revolution.

Her musical works are in volume 10 of her Œuvres complètes; these include Six minuets pour deux violons, alto et basse [i.e., string quartet], dédiés à Monsieur le Baron de Tuyll de Serooskerken Seigneur de Zuylen (la Haye et Amsterdam: B. Hummel et fils, 1786); 9 Sonates voor klavecimbel, and 10 Airs et Romances (Paris: chez M. Bonjour, 1788–1789) for which she wrote both poetry and music. Most of her music was performed in the private circle of her salon at Le Pontet. An opéra-bouffe, a Dutch adaptation of her scandalous novel Le noble titled De Deugd is den Adel waerdig (Vertu vaut bien noblesse) was performed in the Fransche Comedie theater in The Hague on 2 March 1769, her only stage work performed during her lifetime. Both libretto and music are considered lost. She sent a libretto of Les Phéniciennes to Mozart Salzburg, while he was living in Vienna, hoping that he'ld writing music to it, but no reply is known.

=== Critical publications of the original texts ===
- Œuvres complètes, Édition critique par J-D. Candaux, C.P. Courtney, P.H. Dubois, S. Dubois-de Bruyn, P. Thompson, J. Vercruysse, D.M. Wood. Amsterdam, G.A. van Oorschot, 1979–1984. Tomes 1-6, Correspondance; tome 7, Theatre; tomes 8-9, Romans, Contes et Nouvelles; tome 10, Essais, Vers, Musique. ISBN 9789028205000
- Die wiedergefundene Handschrift: Victoire ou la vertu sans bruit. Hrsg. Magdalene Heuser. In: Editio. Internationales Jahrbuch für Editionswissenschaft. 11 (1997), p. 178–204.
- Early writings. New material from Dutch archives. Ed. Kees van Strien, Leuven, Éditions Peeters, 2005. VI-338 p. ISBN 978-90-429-1646-3
- Correspondances et textes inédits. Ed. Guillemette Samson, J-D. Candaux, J. Vercruysse et D. Wood. Paris, Honoré Champion, 2006 423 p. ISBN 978-2-7453-1310-2

=== Translations ===
- Letters written from Lausanne. Translated from the French. Bath, printed by R. Cruttwell and sold by C. Dilly, Poultry, London, 1799. 2 vols. viii, 175 p. + 200 p.
- Four tales by Zélide. Translated [and abridged] by S[ybil]. M[arjorie]. S[cott-Cuffe] with an introduction by Geoffrey Scott. [The Nobleman, Mistress Henley, Letters from Lausanne, Letters from Lausanne-Caliste]. London, Constable, 1925. xxix, 263 p. Reprint by Books for Libraries Press, Freeport, New York, 1970. Reprint by Turtle Point Press, Chappaqua, New York, 1997. 304 p.
- Letters from Mistress Henley published by her friend. Translation Philip Stewart and Jean Vaché. Introduction, notes and bibliography by Joan Hinde Stewart & Philip Stuart. New York, The Modern Language Association of America, 1993. xxix, 42 p.
- Letters from Switzerland. [Letters from Neuchatel, Letters from Mistress Henley, Letters from Lausanne, Letters from Lausanne-Caliste]. Ed., translation and biography James Chesterman. Cambridge U.K., Carole Green Publishing, 2001. xii, 276 p. ISBN 9781903479032
- Three women. A novel by the abbé de la Tour. Translation Emma Rooksby. New York, The Modern Language Association of America, 2007. xii, 176 p. ISBN 9780873529419
- The Nobleman and Other Romances. [The Nobleman; Letters from Neuchâtel; Letters from Mistress Henley Published by Her Friend; Letters from Lausanne: Cécile; Eaglonette and Suggestina, or, On Pliancy; Émigré Letters; Fragments of Two Novels Written in English: A Correspondence, Letters from Peter and William; Constance's Story; Saint Anne], Translated, introduction and notes Caroline Warman. Cover ill. Joanna Walsh. New York, Penguin Classics, 2012. XXXIII, 439 p. ISBN 978-0-14-310660-9
- Honorine d'Userche [a novella by Abbé de la Tour], translator Caroline Omolesky, e-book, Messidor Press, 2013.

=== Correspondence ===
- Boswell in Holland, including his correspondence with Belle de Zuylen (Zélide). Ed. Frederick Pottle. 428 p. London: William Heinemann, 1952.
- Letter of Isabelle de Charrière to James Boswell 27 March 1768. Published in The General Correspondence of James Boswell (1766–1769), ed. Richard Cole, Peter Baker, Edinburgh University Press, 1993, vol.2, p. 40-41.
- There are no letters like yours. The correspondence of Isabelle de Charrière and Constant d'Hermenches. Translated, with an introduction and annotations by Janet Whatley and Malcolm Whatley. Lincoln NE, University of Nebraska Press, 2000. xxxv, 549 p.

=== Le Noble, conte moral, 1763 ===
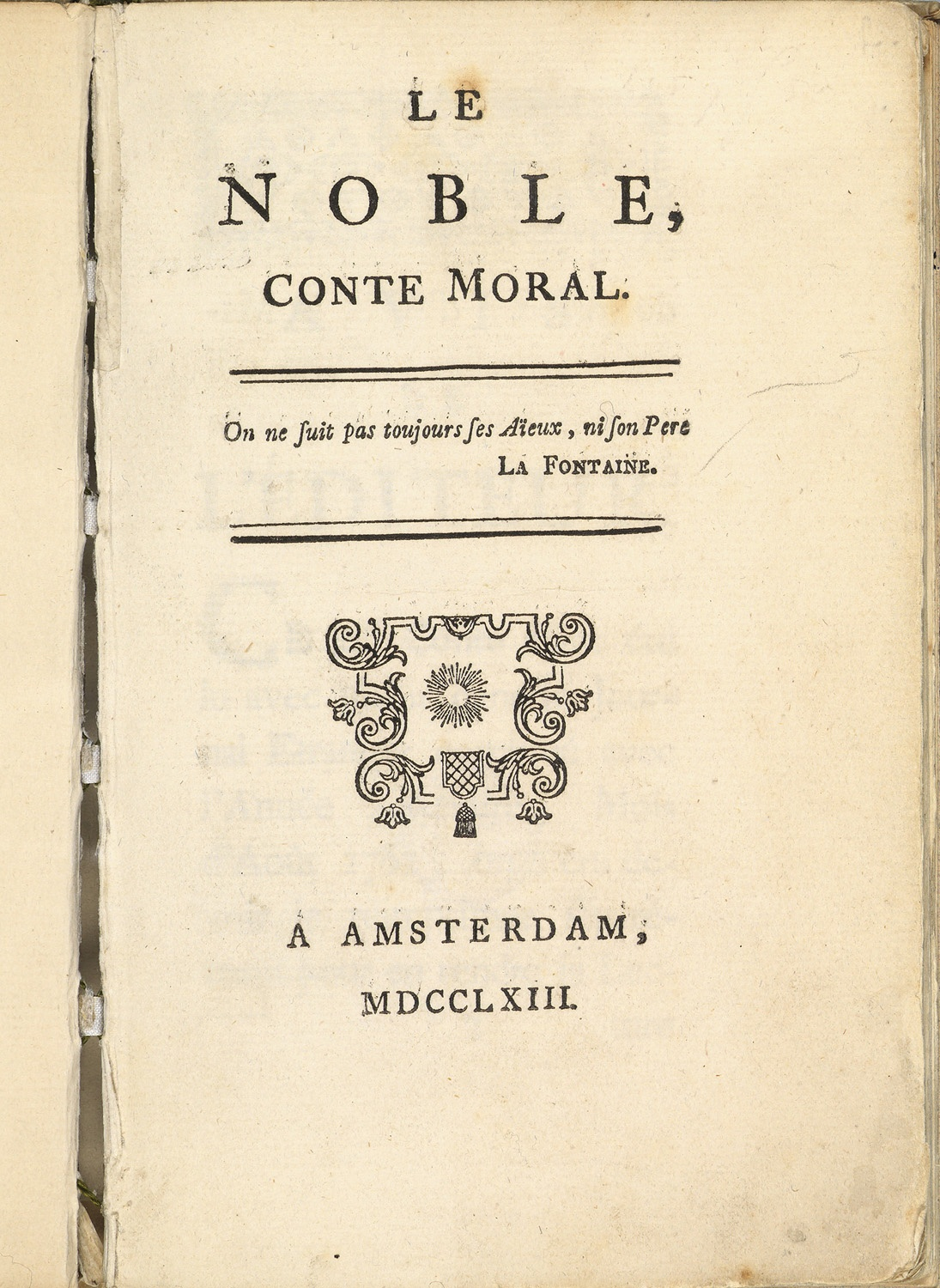
Title page of Le Noble, conte moral, 1763. Motto: On ne suit pas toujours ses aïeux, ni son père. La Fontaine."

Belle van Zuylen published this short early novel anonymously when she was 22 in a French-language magazine with the Amsterdam publisher Evert van Harrevelt. Van Zuylen's parents bought the entire book edition in 1763, in order to prevent further distribution of this satire on the nobility. But this "moral tale" nevertheless found its way into Europe, because the German poet and statesman Johann Wolfgang Goethe reviewed the German translation Die Vorzüge des alten Adels on 3 November 1772 in the "Frankfurter Gelehrten Anzeigen".

A quote from the fable Education about two dogs by Jean de La Fontaine opens the novel:

- On ne suit pas toujours ses Aïeux, ni son Père (La Fontaine)

Il y avait dans une des provinces de France un château très ancien, habité par un vieux rejeton d'une famille encore plus ancienne. Le baron d'Arnonville était très sensible au mérite de cette ancienneté, et il avait raison, car il n'avait pas beaucoup d'autres mérites. Mais son château se serait mieux trouvé d'être un peu plus moderne: une des tours comblait déjà une partie du fossé; on ne voyait dans le reste qu'un peu d'eau bourbeuse, et les grenouilles y avaient pris la place des poissons. Sa table était frugale, mais tout autour de la salle à manger régnaient les bois des cerfs tués par ses aïeux.

Il se rappelait, les jours gras, qu'il avait droit de chasse, les jours maigres, qu'il avait droit de pêche, et content de ces droits, il laissait sans envie manger des faisans et des carpes aux ignobles financiers. Il dépensait son modique revenu à pousser un procès pour le droit de pendre sur ses terres; et il ne lui serait jamais venu dans l'esprit qu'on pût faire un meilleur usage de son bien, ni laisser à ses enfants quelque chose de mieux que la haute et basse justice. L'argent de ses menus plaisirs, il le mettait à faire renouveler les écussons qui bordaient tous les planchers, et à faire repeindre ses ancêtres.

— Isabelle de Charrière, Le Noble, conte moral, 1762.
Translation:

- We do not always follow our ancestors, nor even resemble our fathers. La Fontaine

In a French province there was an ancient castle, inhabited by an old scion of an even older family. The Baron of Arnonville attached great importance to this ancestry, and rightly so, for he had little other merit. But his castle could have been a trifle more modern: the rubble of one of the towers had already filled in part of the moat. For the rest, you could only discern some muddy water, in which frogs had replaced the fish. His table was frugal, but antlers of deer shot by his ancestors reigned all around the dining room.

On meat days he remembered his right to hunt, on fishing days his right to fish. Contented with these rights, he tolerated without envy that base tax farmers ate the pheasants and the carp. He spent his modest income pushing a lawsuit over the right to hang people on his estate, and it would never have occurred to him that he could make better use of his property or that he could leave his children anything better than the high and low justice. The money for his little pleasures he put into the renovation of the escutcheons along the baseboards and the repainting of the portraits of his ancestors.

== Miscellany ==
- The asteroid 9604 Bellevanzuylen was named in her honour in 1991 by Eric Walter Elst.
- The film Belle van Zuylen - Madame de Charrière was directed by Digna Sinke in 1993.
- The Belle van Zuylen Chair of Utrecht University, Netherlands, was held by Cecil Courtney (1995), Monique Moser-Verrey (April 2005), Nicole Pellegrin-Postel (October 2005).
- The annual Belle van Zuylen Lecture, on themes relating to literature and society in general, is part of the International Literature Festival Utrecht (ILFU), formerly called City2Cities, delivered by contemporary authors such as Hans Magnus Enzensberger (2006), Jeanette Winterson (2007), Azar Nafisi (2009) and Paul Auster (2012), Chimamanda Ngozi Adichie (2020) and Margaret Atwood (2021). Since 2020 they receive a little sculpture called the Belle van Zuylenring.

== Bibliography ==
In chronological order by publication year:

- Julia Kavanagh, French Women of Letters. Biografical Sketches. (in one volume). Leipzig, Bernard Taugnitz, 1862. Chapter xvii p. 227-240 Madame de Charrière.
- Philippe Godet: Madame de Charrière et ses amis, d’après de nombreux documents inédits (1740–1805) avec portraits, vues, autographes, etc.. Genève, A. Jullien, 1906 (xiii,519 p. + 448 p.). Genève, Slatkine Reprints, 1973.
- Geoffrey Scott. The portrait of Zélide. London, Constable, 1925. xiii, 215 p. Scott on Zélide : the portrait of Zélide. Introduction by Richard Holmes. London, Flamingo, 2002. Reprint by Turtle Point Press, New York, 2010. 256 p. with an introduction by Shirley Hazzard, afterword by Richard Dunn.
- Constance Thompson Pasquali, Madame de Charrière à Colombier : iconographie, Neuchâtel, Bibliothèque de la Ville, 1979.
- C.P. Courtney. A preliminary bibliography of Isabelle de Charrière (Belle de Zuylen). Oxford, Voltaire Foundation, 1980. 157 p.
- C.P. Courtney. Isabelle de Charrière (Belle de Zuylen). A secondary bibliography. Oxford, Voltaire Foundation, 1982. 50 p.
- C.P. Courtney. Isabelle de Charrière and the 'Character of H.B. Constant'. A false attribution. In: French Studies (Oxford), 36 (1982), no. 3, p. 282-289.
- C.P. Courtney, Isabelle de Charrière (Belle de Zuylen). A biography. Oxford, Voltaire Foundation, 1993. 810 p. ISBN 9780729404396
- Kathleen M. Jaeger, Male and Female Roles in the Eighteenth Century. The Challenge to Replacement and Displacement in the Novels of Isabelle de Charrière, New York, Peter Lang, 1994. XI, 241 pp. ISBN 978-0-8204-2179-7
- C.P. Courtney, Belle van Zuylen and Philosophy. Utrecht, Universiteit Utrecht, 1995. 32 p.
- Jacquline Letzter, Intellectual tacking. Questions of education in the works of Isabelle de Charrière. Amsterdam, Rodopi, 1998. 217 p. ISBN 978-9042002906
- Jacquline Letzter and Robert Adelson, Women Writing Opera: Creativity and Controversy in the Age of the French Revolution. Berkeley, University of California Press, 2001. xvii, 341 p. ISBN 978-0520226531
- Carla Alison Hesse, The other enlightenment: how French women became modern. Princeton NJ, Princeton University Press, 2001. - XVI, 233p. ISBN 978-0691114804
- Vincent Giroud and Janet Whatley, Isabelle de Charrière. Proceedings of the international conference held at Yale University, 2002. New Haven CT. The Beinecke rare book and manuscript library, 2004. v, 151 p. ISBN 978-0845731604
- Jelka Samsom, Individuation and attachment in the works of Isabelle de Charrière New York, Peter Lang, 2005. ISBN 978-3039101870
- Monique Moser-Verrey, Isabelle de Charrière and the Novel in the 18th century. Utrecht, Universiteit Utrecht, 2005. 32 p.
- Nicole Pellegrin, Useless or pleasant? Women and the writing of history at the time of Belle van Zuylen (1740–1805). Utrecht, University Utrecht, 2005. 32 p.
- Suzan van Dijk, Valérie Cossy, Monique Moser, Madeleine van Strien, Belle de Zuylen/Isabelle de Charrière: Education, Creation, Reception. Amsterdam, Rodopi, 2006, 343 p. ISBN 978-90-420-1998-0
- Gillian E. Dow, Translators, interpreters, mediators: women writers 1700-1900. [Mary Wollstonecraft, Isabelle de Charrière, Therese Huber, Elizabeth Barrett Browning, Fatma Aliye, Anna Jameson, Anne Gilchrist] Oxford, Peter Lang, 2007. 268 p. ISBN 978-3-03911-055-1
- Heidi Bostic, The fiction of enlightenment: women of reason in the French eighteenth century [Francoise de Graffigny, Marie-Jeanne Riccoboni, Isabelle de Charrière]. Newark DE, University of Delaware Press, 2010. 270 p. ISBN 978-1611491302
- Emma M. Dunne, The pursuit of happiness: Obstacles and opportunities in the Complete Works of Isabelle de Charrière (1740–1805). University College Dublin, Dublin, 2022.

== Discography ==
- Belle van Zuylen / Mme de Charrière: Een Muzikaal Verhaal ("A Musical Story"). Muziek van Belle van Zuylen, Frederik II van Pruisen, Anna Amalia van Pruisen, Jean Jacques Rousseau. Contents: Six menuets pour deux violons, alto et basse; Sonate voor Klavecimbel Opus 3 No. 1 in C-groot; Sonate voor Klavecimbel Opus 3 No. 2 Deel 1 in F-groot; et 8 Airs et Danses avec accompagnement de clavecin—Romance "Arbre Charmant"; "Pauvre Agneau"; "De la ville et des champs" (aria met twee violen en continuo); "Lise aimoit"; "Timarette s'en est allée" (aria met twee violen en continuo); autre air pour "Lise aimoit"; Air "Tout Cède A La Beauté"; Air "Douce Retraite." Utrechts Barok Consort m.m.v. Wilke te Brummelstreete. Utrecht: Slot Zuylen CD 423206, 2005.
- Belle van Zuylen (Madame de Charrière) and Contemporaries. Madelon Michel, soprano; Fania Chapiro, pianoforte. Contents: Sonata in C major Op. 2 No. 2; Airs et Romances: "L'an passé," "De la ville et des champs", "Pauvre Agneau," "L'amour est un enfant trompeur," "Timarette s'en est allée," "Lise aimoit," autre air pour "Lise aimoit", "Arbre charmant," "Douce retraite," "Tout cède à la beauté d'Elise." (Contemporaries: Rameau, Sarti, Rousseau, and Cimarosa.) Rotterdam: Erasmus Muziek Producties, ©1994.
