= Esther de Gélieu =

Swiss educator (1757–1817)

Esther de Gélieu (20 September 1757 - 13 June 1817), was a Swiss educator.

She managed a girls' school in Neuchâtel until she was employed as the first principal of the first girls' college in Germany (1782–1786), the Karolinen-Gymnasium in Frankenthal. In 1786, she was employed as governess at the court of the counts of Nassau-Weilburg. She later managed a school for girls in Basel, where she helped teach Isabelle Morel.
