= Zuylen Castle =

Castle in Oud-Zuilen, Netherlands

- Slot Zuylen
- Oud-Zuilen, the Netherlands
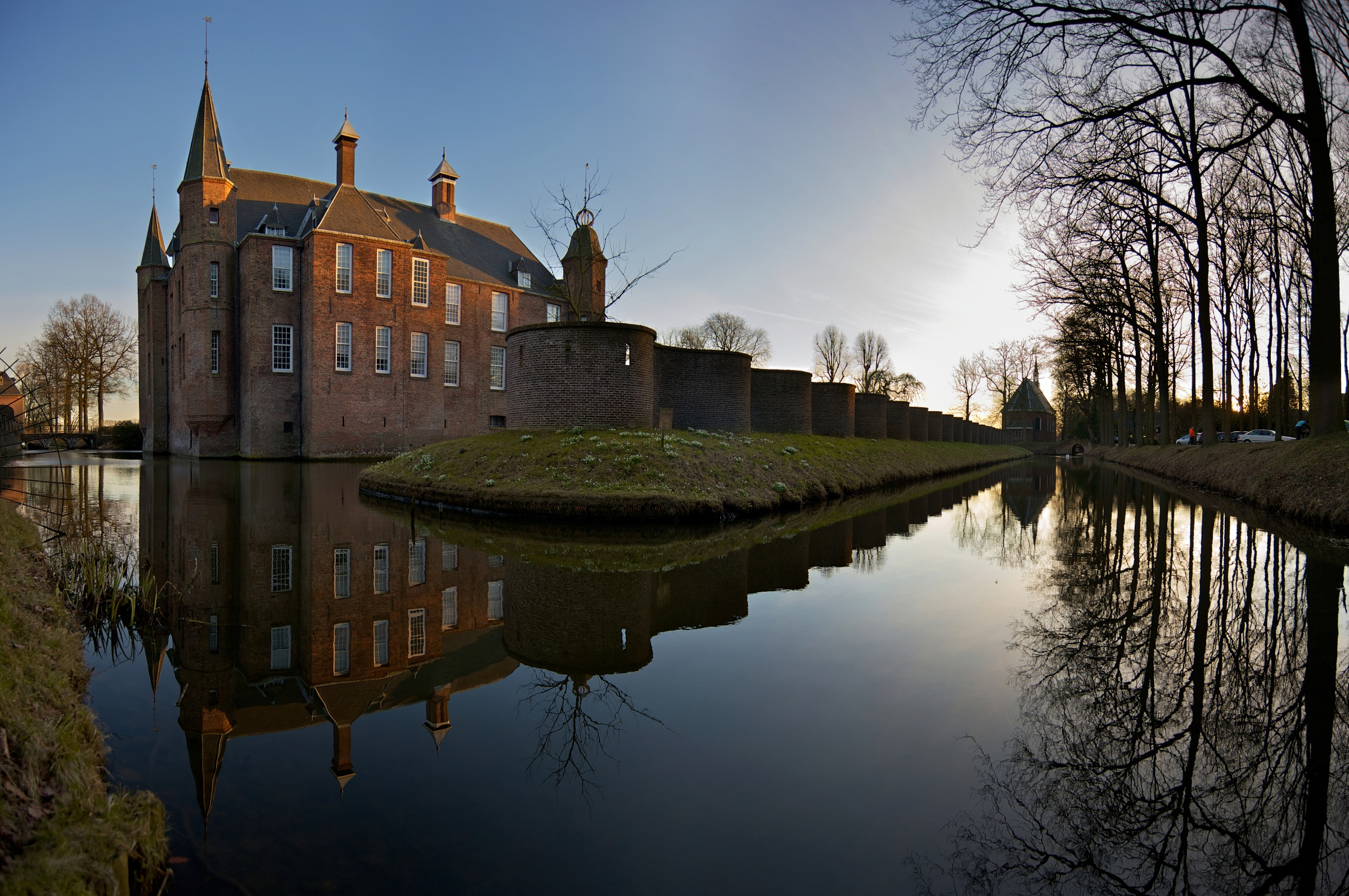
- Zuylen Castle

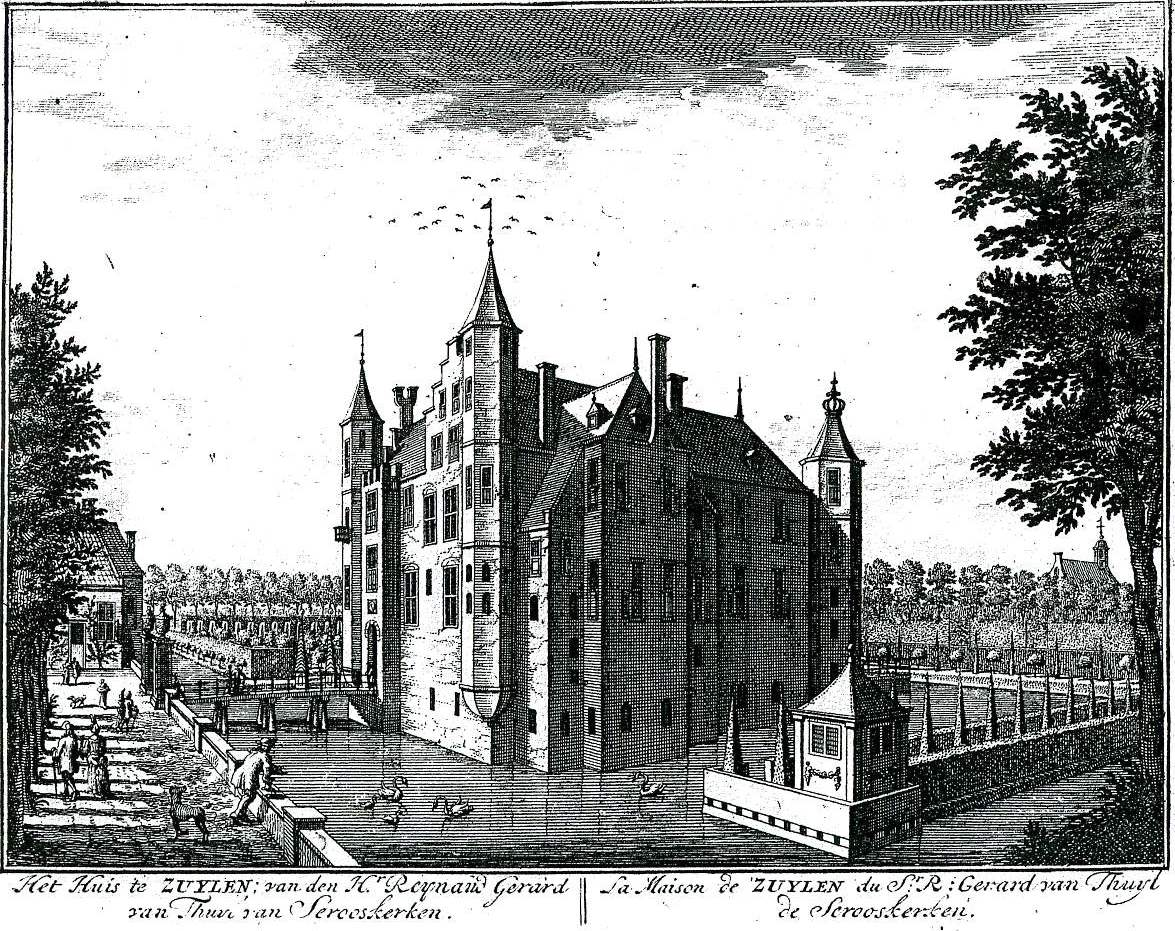
- Zuylen Castle (1700–1751)

Site information
- Type: Castle
- Open to the public: Yes
- Condition: Good

Location
- The Netherlands
- Coordinates: 52.1271°N 5.0730°E

Site history
- Built: 13th century; rebuilt 1510–1522
- Built by: Lord van Suilen en Anholt (medieval period); possibly Rombout II Keldermans around 1520 for the main building and entrance gate; garden partly designed by J.D. Zocher jr. around 1840
- Materials: Brick
- Demolished: 1422

Zuylen Castle (Dutch: Slot Zuylen [slɔt ˈsœylə(n)]) is a Dutch castle at the village of Oud-Zuilen just north of the city of Utrecht. It is located along the river Vecht at the southern end of the Vechtstreek.

The castle was originally built in the 13th century by lord van Suilen en Anholt as a simple donjon. In 1422 during the Hook and Cod wars the castle was completely demolished. In 1510 rebuilding started. In 1752 the castle was modified for the last time. It holds a tapestry by the Delft carpet weaver Maximiliaan van der Gught. Its past inhabitants include Steven van der Hagen and Belle van Zuylen.

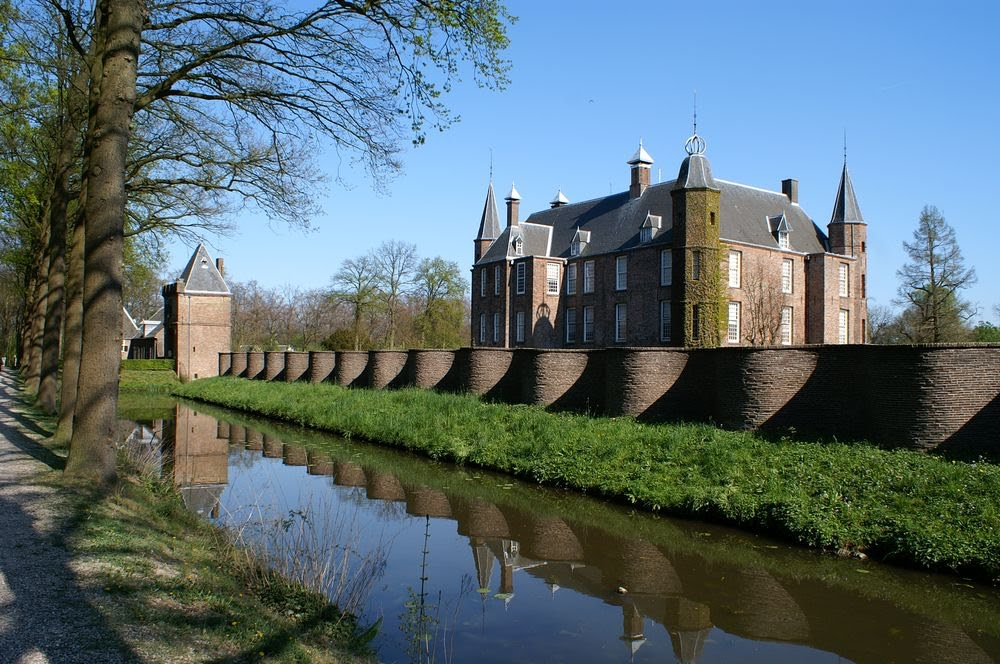
Slot Zuylen with serpentine wall

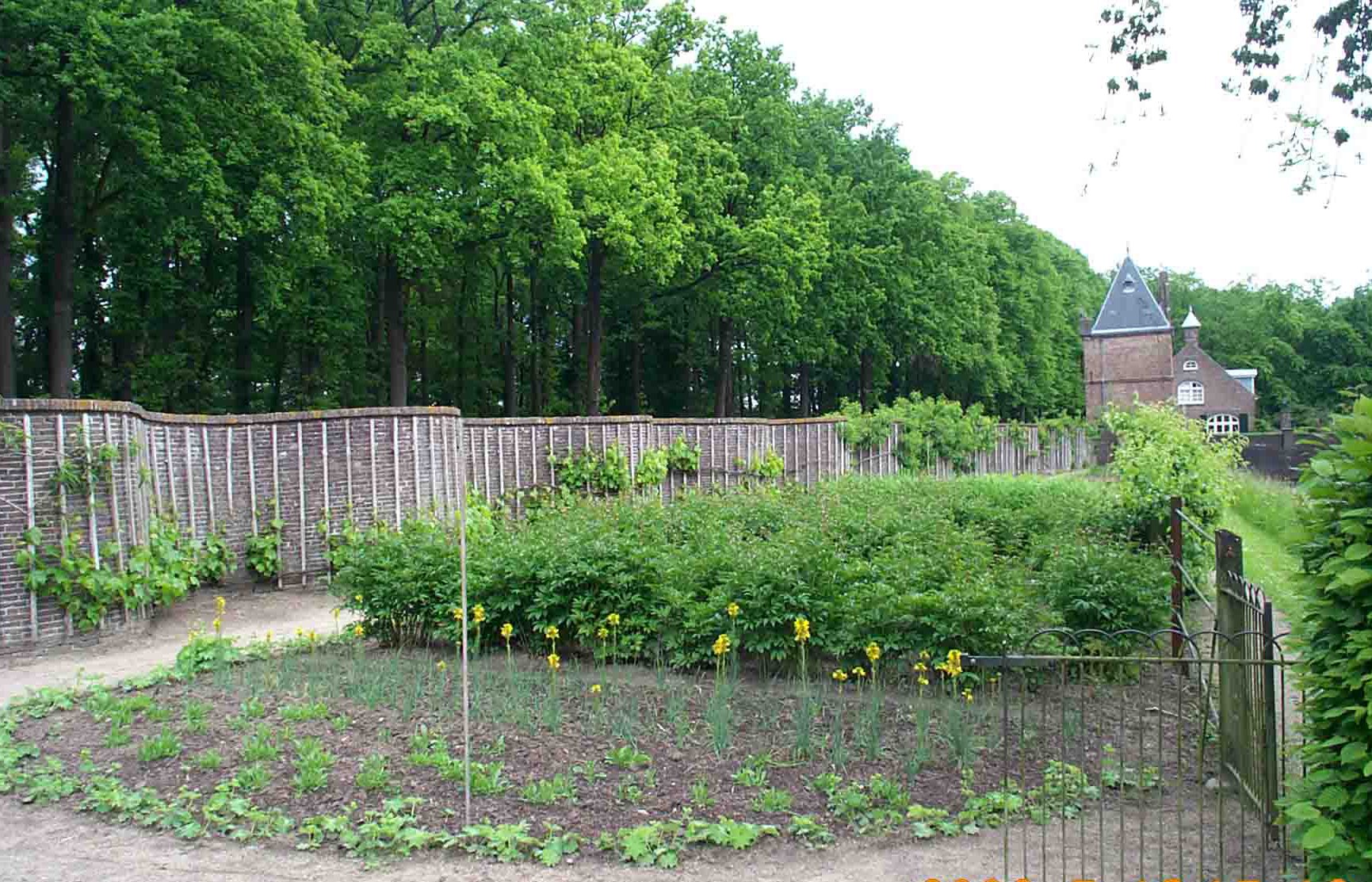
Serpentine wall (for fruits)

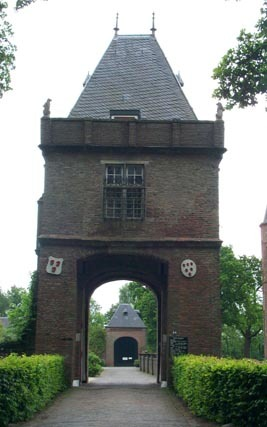
Entrance gate
