= Vechtstreek =

Region in Utrecht and North Holland, the Netherlands

Coordinates: 52.2295°N 5.0640°E

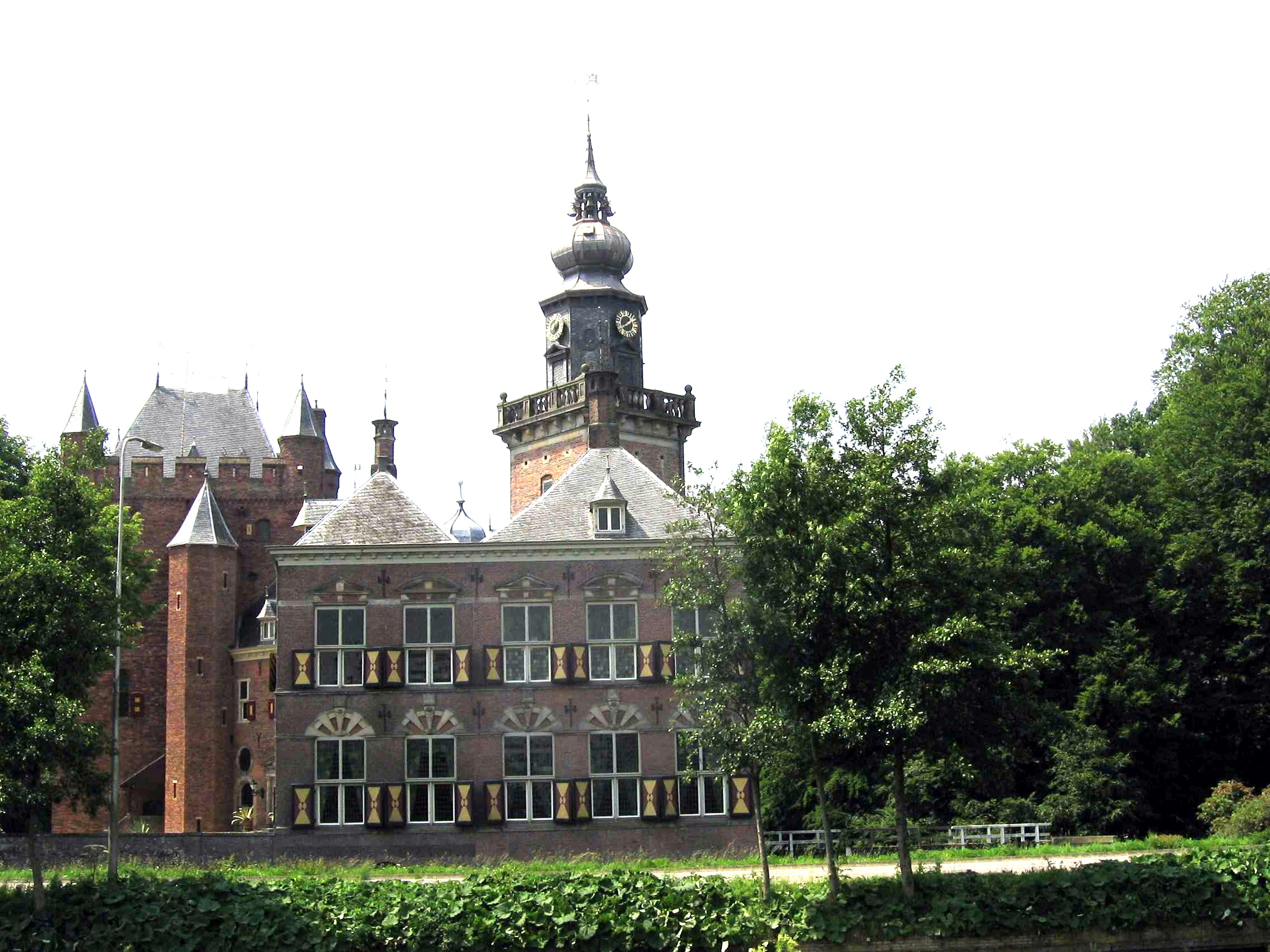
Nijenrode Castle, located near the river Vecht

The Vechtstreek (pronounced [ˈvɛx(t)streːk]; Dutch for 'Vecht Area') is a region in the Dutch provinces of Utrecht and North Holland along the Vecht River between the towns of Utrecht and Amsterdam. Located in the economic heartland of the Netherlands, it is known for its natural environment and history. The Vechtstreek is known for its many vestiges of the Dutch Golden Age, including castles, homes, parks and tea houses. They bear witness to the greatness and wealth of that period, the important commercial role played by the Vecht River and the area's history as a residential area for the nobility and wealthy.

== Topography ==
The Vecht River begins in the historic centre of Utrecht, where it receives much of its water from the Kromme Rijn, a minor branch of the Lower Rhine. It passes old towns like Oud-Zuilen, Maarssen, Breukelen, Nieuwersluis, Loenen, Vreeland, Nederhorst den Berg, Nigtevecht and Weesp before it flows into the IJsselmeer at Muiden.

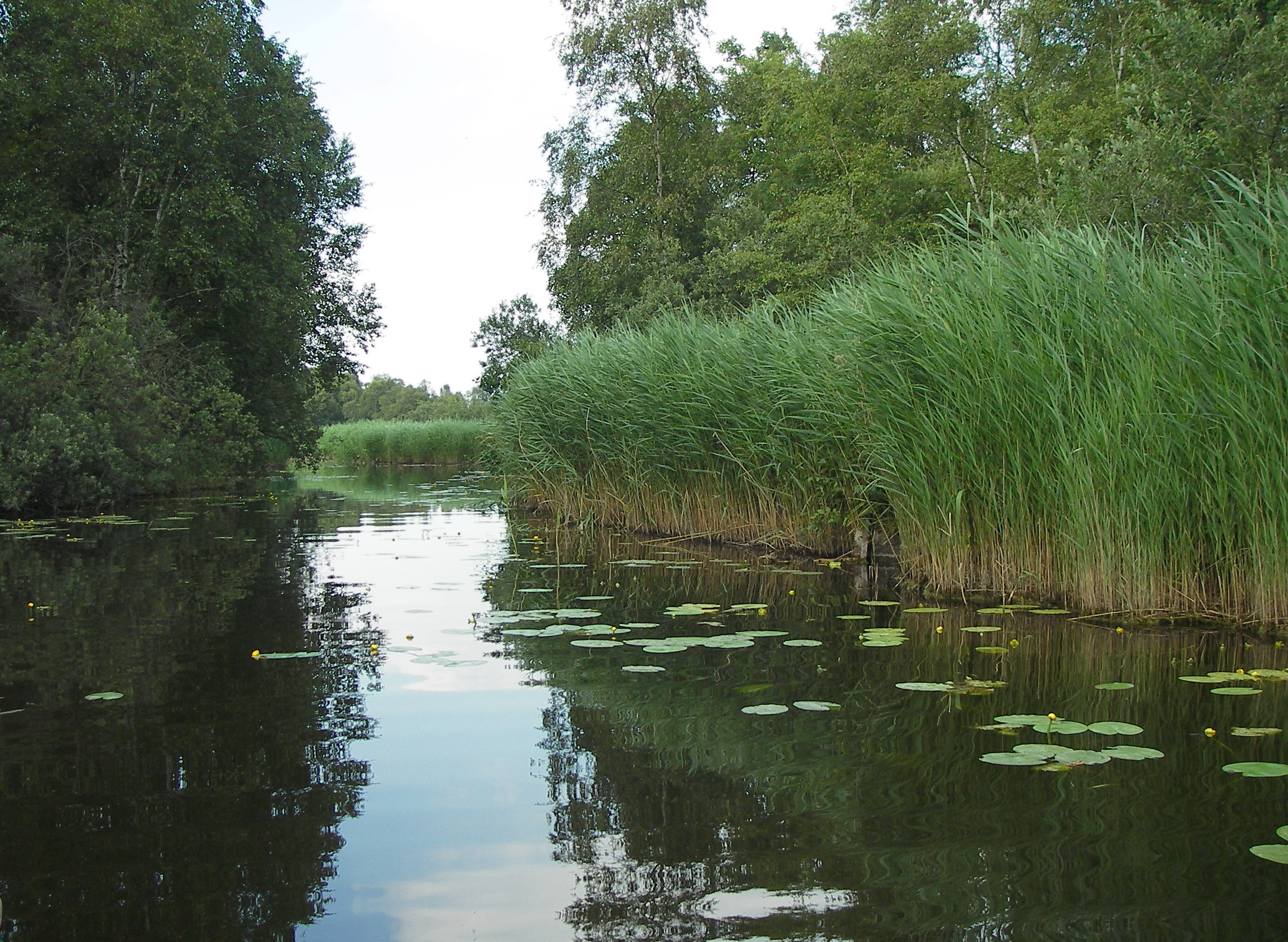
Lake Botshol, one of many lakes formed by peat extraction in de Vechtstreek

The landscape to the east and west of the river is also remarkable. Peat extraction in the 17th and 18th century turned vast low-lying fens into a collection of shallow, man-made lakes and bogs. Water lilies, reeds, swamps and wooded areas have developed spontaneously from the old peat canals (trekgaten) where the peat was extracted. A total of about 70 square kilometres have been designated as a series of nature reserves and are part of the European Natura 2000 scheme.

There are lakes and waterways on both sides of the Vecht. These lakes and interconnecting waterways are referred to as the Vechtplassen ("the Vecht Lakes"), a series of man-made lakes resulting from the peat extraction. The lakes near Loosdrecht are especially popular for sailing. West of the river Vecht there is another important area of man-made lakes, the Vinkeveen lakes.
