= Henriette L'Hardy =

Henriette Marie Françoise L'Hardy (9 December 1768– 27 January 1808) was the lady's companion from the Principality of Neuchâtel of the countess Sophie von Dönhoff, the Prussian lady-in-waiting and a morganatic spouse by bigamy to King Frederick William II of Prussia. She made a self-portrait.

L'Hardy, born in Auvernier, was the eldest daughter of the officer in the French military François Nicolas L'Hardy (1715-1788) and Marie Henriette Rossel (1744-1821). She was a friend of Isabelle de Charrière since August 1791, with whom she exchanged over 240 letters and whose letters and manuscripts she inherited. In her letters Isabelle de Charrière called her often Lucinde after the heroine of Moliere's farce Le Médecin malgré lui.

She was the lady's companion of Sophie von Dönhoff in Prussia: Berlin, Potsdam, Charlottenburg and Sanssouci since September 1791. In June 1792 they went together with the son Friedrich (born 24 January 1792) to the Principality of Neuchâtel starting in Auvernier. On 16 June, Von Dönhoff visited Isabelle de Charrière in Colombier and a correspondence between the two of them began. In Neuchâtel Von Dönhoff gave birth to her daughter Julie on 4 January 1793. From April till 27 September 1793 Von Dönhoff and L'Hardy stayed in Baar. After that Von Dönhoff returned with her children to Prussia.

When she was settled in Angermünde she asked L'Hardy to join her again 23 August 1794. She stayed there till the end of August 1795 and returned to Auvernier.

Her memories of the time at the Prussian court L'Hardy wrote with assistance of De Charrière in 1801 Mes souvenirs sur Berlin, Potsdam et Sanssouci. after the publication of Louis Philippe, comte de Ségur in 1800 'Histoire des principaux évènements du règne de Fréderic-Guillaume II'. The last days of Isabelle de Charrière life she kept watch over her with Therese Forster until her death on the morning of 27 December 1805.

She married the historian Louis-Henri-Eusèbe Gaullieur on 16 September 1806. The couple had a son, Eusèbe-Henri born 21 January 1808, later a historian as well, but she died soon after his birth in Auvernier. A self-portrait, described in various sources as a pastel or as an oil on canvas painting, still exists in a private collection.
