= Claire von Greyerz =

German papercutting artist (1789–1839)

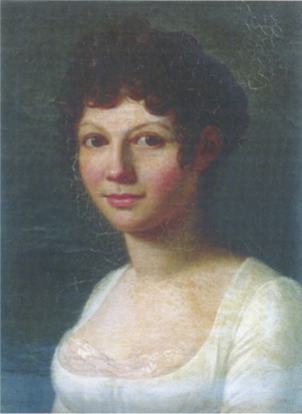
Clara Forster in 1805, painted by Ludovike Simanowiz

Clara von Greyerz (née Forster; 21 November 1789 – 3 February 1839) was a German papercutting artist. She was born in Mainz, the daughter of world traveller Georg Forster and his wife Therese. Her father became a revolutionary in the Republic of Mainz from 1792 until his death in 1794, while her mother lived in the Neuchâtel area with her lover and eventual husband Ludwig Ferdinand Huber. The family moved to Tübingen, Stuttgart and Ulm, where her stepfather died in December 1804, when she was already engaged to the forester Gottlieb von Greyerz. They married in 1805, living in Stoffenried, Günzburg, Augsburg and Bayreuth, and had ten children between 1806 and 1832. In Augsburg, von Greyerz became acquainted with Hortense de Beauharnais, and her children played with Hortense's son, the future Napoleon III of France. Von Greyerz was known for her papercuts, some of which she swapped with fellow artist Luise Duttenhofer. In 1836, she visited Hortense at Arenenberg and published a report of her experiences there.

== Early life ==
Clara Forster, usually called Claire by her family, was born on 21 November 1789 in Mainz. (Note: Some sources state she was born in 1790, which is incompatible with the birth of her sister Luise in June 1791. Her birthday is also given as 22 November, which is the date of her baptism in the St Emmeran Church in Mainz.) She was the second daughter of Georg Forster and his wife Therese. Her father, who had taken part in the second voyage of James Cook, was the librarian of the University of Mainz. She had an older sister Therese, who was born in 1786. In 1790, her mother and Ludwig Ferdinand Huber, a young Saxon diplomat and writer, became lovers. Forster accepted living in a ménage à trois, and Huber moved into the house of the Forsters in autumn 1790.

The city of Mainz was captured by French revolutionary troops under General Custine in October 1792. This led to the establishment of a Jacobin club and later the Republic of Mainz, in which Georg Forster became an important figure. Her mother then left Mainz for Strasbourg in December 1792, accompanied by her daughters and the Forsters' lodger, Thomas Brand. On the way, they met soldiers who mocked them, but were delighted by Clara greeting them with Bonjour citoyens! In January 1793, Therese and the children continued to Neuchâtel. She planned to divorce Forster and marry Huber, and Forster agreed that Clara should live with them after the divorce, unlike her elder sister who was his favourite. In November 1793, Georg, who had gone to Paris as representative of the Mainz Republic, managed to come to Travers, where he stayed with his wife and children and Huber for a few days. This was the last time that Claire met her father, who died in Paris on 10 January 1794. On 10 April 1794, her mother and Huber were married. The family moved to Bôle near Neuchâtel, and started using French as the family language.

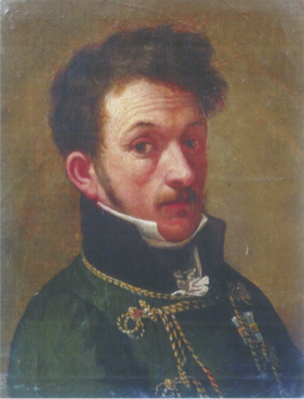
Gottlieb von Greyerz, ca. 1805, painting by Georg Volmar

When Huber obtained editorial positions at Johann Friedrich Cotta's Neueste Weltkunde and then the Allgemeine Zeitung in 1798, the family moved to Tübingen and then to Stuttgart. Huber met Gottlieb von Greyerz, who had obtained a position of head forester in Stoffenried close to Günzburg, and introduced him to his family. In 1804, the Huber family moved to Ulm. The 27-year-old Gottlieb von Greyerz became engaged to 14-year-old Claire; Huber was on a journey to Leipzig and Berlin and consented in a letter. The wedding was supposed to take place two years later. Ludwig Huber died in Ulm on 24 December 1804, leading to the wedding being moved earlier, to spring of 1805. In preparation, her mother sent Claire and her sister Luise to Stuttgart for two months; Claire was supposed to be educated in music, especially in playing the guitar, before getting married.

== Married life ==
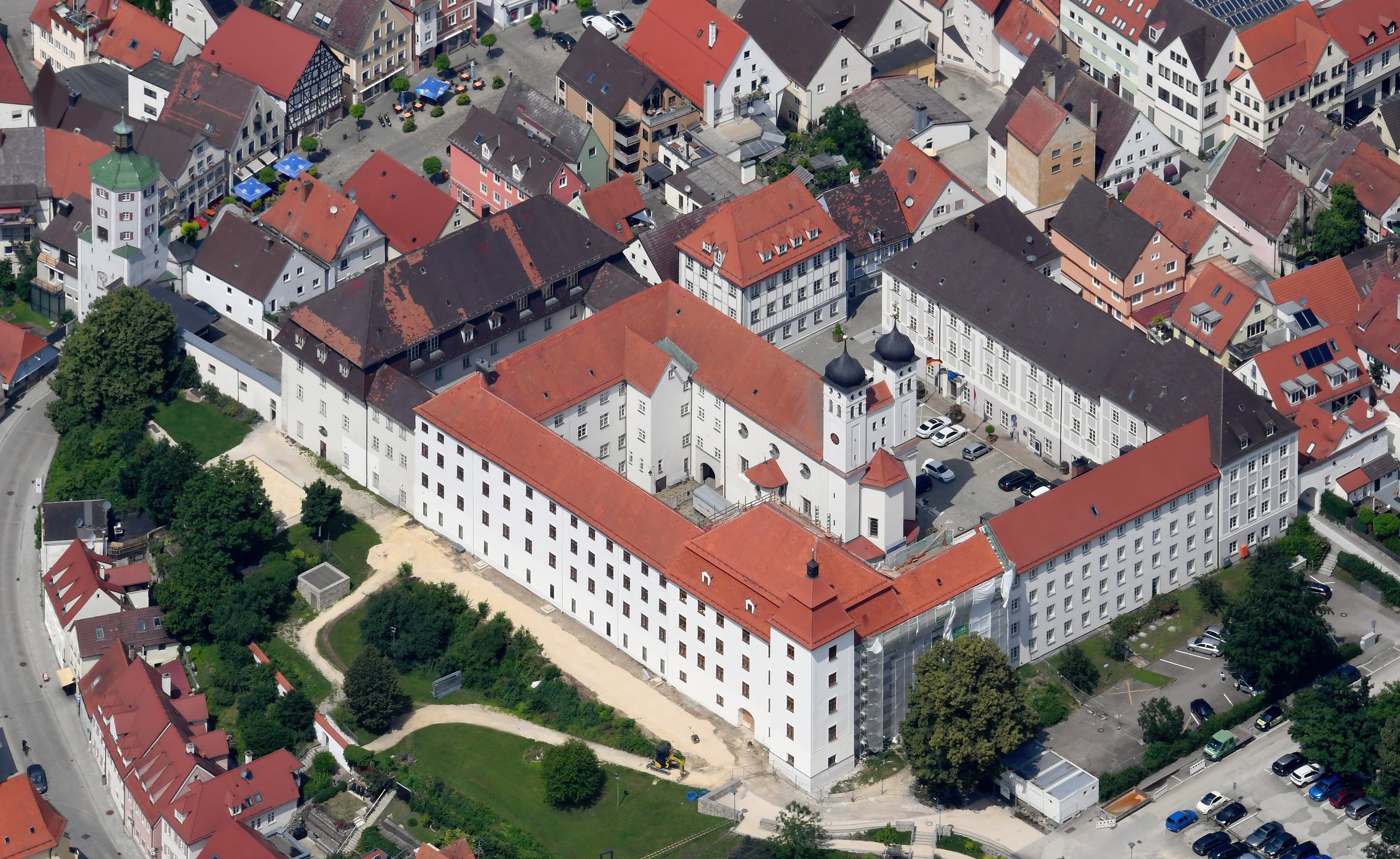
Castle in Günzburg

Claire and Gottlieb von Greyerz married in Göppingen on 9 May 1805. They had ten children, born between 1806 and 1832:

- Maximilian Leon Emil (called Emil, 4 June 1806–9 December 1806), born in Stoffenried
- Maria Emilie Therese (called Molly, 3 March 1808–15 January 1890), born in Stoffenried
- Walo (1809–8 March 1815), born in Günzburg
- Georg Leo Emil (called Emil, 20 April 1811–11 March 1869), born in Günzburg, later forester in Bern
- Alphons (5 June 1813–4 June 1864), teacher in Bern
- Friedrich Karl Walo (called Walo, 11 October 1815–1904), born in Günzburg, later forester in Lenzburg
- Ludwig Ferdinand Adolph (called Adolf, 1818–2 April 1871), born in Günzburg, forester, died in Interlaken
- Ida Emma Klara (18 March 1820–1913), married A. Halter in Bern
- Otto Aimé (29 November 1829–16 January 1882), born in Bayreuth, parish priest
- Adeline (13 September 1832–2 February 1896), born in Bayreuth, died in Bern

Claire's mother moved into their Stoffenried house with her children Luise and Victor Aimé and lived with the family until 1816. Gottlieb became senior forester for the Günzburg area in 1806 and moved to official living quarters in the castle in Günzburg in January 1807. From 1810 to 1829, Gottlieb was Royal Bavarian Forest Inspector in Augsburg; the family moved from Günzburg to Augsburg in November 1818. In Augsburg, she became acquainted with Hortense de Beauharnais, the former queen consort of Holland. The von Greyerz children played with and were sometimes educated together with Hortense's son Louis-Napoléon, who later became Napoleon III of France. In 1823, Claire's mother also moved to Augsburg, where she died in June 1829. From 1829, Gottlieb worked in Bayreuth. In 1836, during a visit to Switzerland, von Greyerz visited Hortense at her Arenenberg residence and wrote a report about the castle and the life of the Napoleon family. Her report, which has been described both as "somewhat trivial" and as among "the most vivid and detailed descriptions of life at Arenenberg", was published in the Unterhaltungsblatt für und von Frauen in May 1838 and re-published in the Thurgauer Jahrbuch in 1941. Claire von Greyerz died in Bayreuth on 3 February 1839.

== Papercuts ==
Gottlieb von Greyerz, 1817 papercut by Claire von Greyerz

Von Greyerz was an accomplished papercutting artist. According to a story told by her granddaughter Emilie Billon-Haller, this began when she was given paper and scissors during an illness at age six. The Stuttgart-based papercutting artist Luise Duttenhofer was a family friend who made a silhouette of her mother and was an artistic influence, as evidenced by von Greyerz' use of the same embossing techniques to make her work more lively. It is possible that the two women came in contact during one of von Greyerz' visits to Stuttgart between 1803 and 1815, where von Greyerz stayed with Duttenhofer's friend Karl Mayer in 1813. The two women swapped papercuts, and some of the von Greyerz papercuts are now in the collection of the Schiller-Nationalmuseum, just like those of Duttenhofer. As not all papercuts were signed, it is sometimes difficult to identify the creator in collections including works by both women. According to Billon-Haller, the von Greyerz papercuts are poetic, allegoric or romantic and include beautiful landscapes. There are also domestic scenes and antique or mythological themes present in her work, as well as Biblical or Indic motives that she had encountered while reading.

She was featured in the 2017 edition of her hometown's Mainzer Frauenkalender, a calendar featuring women associated with Mainz.
