= Michael Huber (writer) =

German writer (1727–1804)

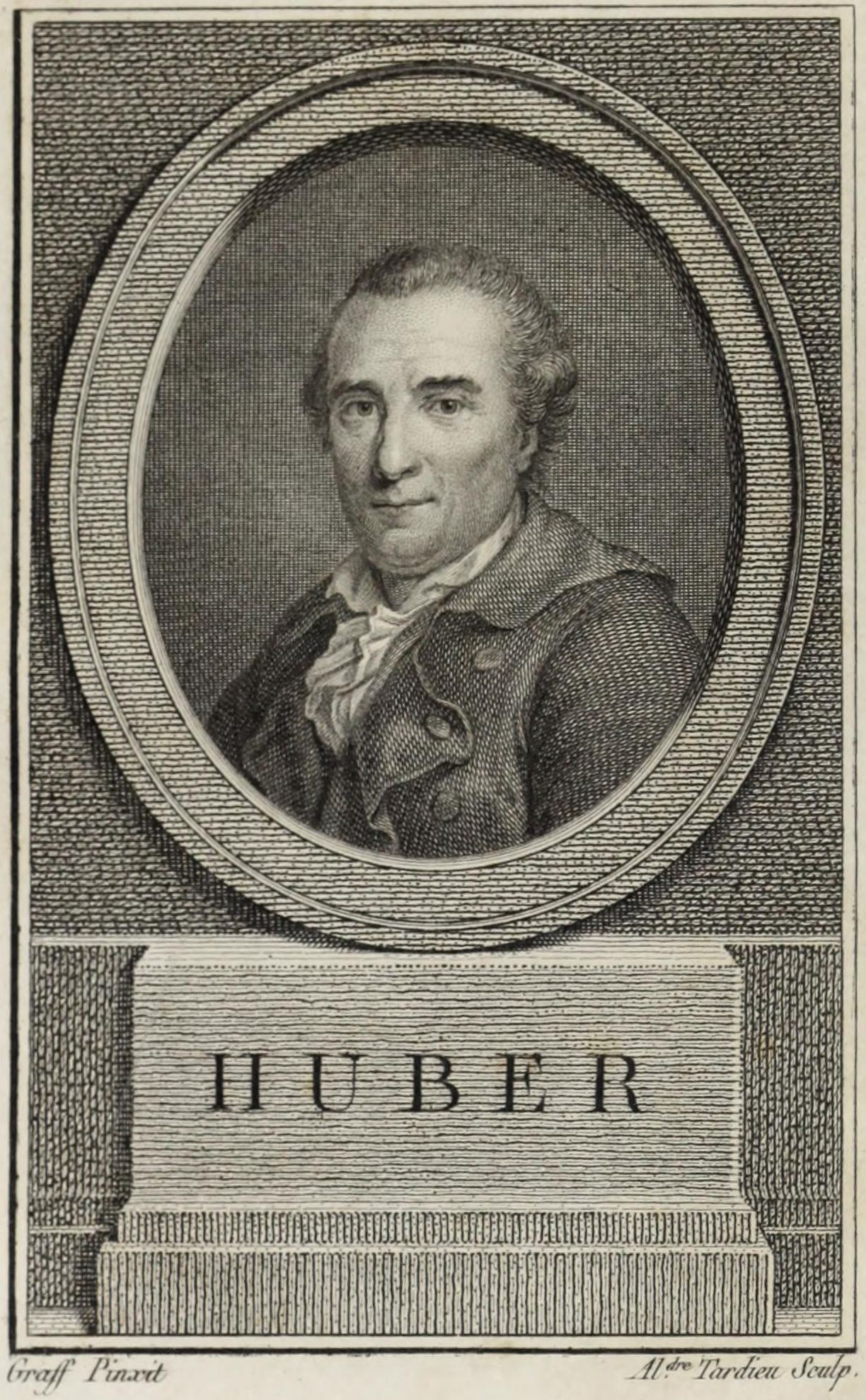
Michael Huber, engraving by Pierre Alexandre Tardieu after a painting by Anton Graff, before 1799

Michael Huber (27 September 1727 – 15 April 1804) was a German writer, translator and art expert. Born in Bavaria, he moved to Paris as a young man, where he probably worked as a language teacher. In the 1750s, he became a contributor to a French literary journal presenting foreign literature and started translating; his successful translations of the works of the Swiss poet Salomon Gessner into French were instrumental in popularising Gessner's works outside German-speaking areas. Huber also published an anthology of German poetry in French, with an introduction that separated German literary history into four distinct eras and was also translated into German.

In 1766, Huber, his French wife Anna-Louise and their only surviving child, Ludwig Ferdinand Huber, moved to Leipzig. Huber became a teacher of French at the University of Leipzig, but as a Catholic, could not obtain a formal chair at the Protestant university. He continued to translate German works into French, but was also interested in art history and had a collection of copper engravings that he used for teaching. He translated Johann Joachim Winckelmann's 1764 History of Art in Antiquity into French, edited several collections of engravings and wrote a nine-volume history of engravings that included a general theory of art.

== Early life ==
Little is known about Huber's youth. He was born on 27 September 1727 in Loitersdorf, part of Frontenhausen in Bavaria, as an extramarital child. His father was called Vitus Huber, and his mother was called Barbara Lützelkirchen. (Note: According to the Bavarian archivist Knöpfler, the baptismal registry originally gave the father's name as "Preutenauer", and the name was changed to "Huber" decades later.) Huber emigrated to France at an unknown time, not earlier than 1742, moving to Paris possibly around 1750. (Note: In a letter written in 1767, Huber states that he has been away from Frontenhausen for 23 years.) It is unclear how he was educated and how he came to Paris, but it is assumed he worked as a language teacher and that his financial situation was unstable. Huber later described his early life as difficult.

== Translator in Paris ==
In the late 1750s, Huber became a contributor to the Journal étranger, a journal introducing French readers to foreign literature. In 1759, his French translation of the Swiss poet Salomon Gessner's Der Tod Abels as La Mort d'Abel ('The Death of Abel') appeared and was very successful. This translation was a collaboration with the French statesman Anne Robert Jacques Turgot, who was interested in German literature, learned German from Huber and became an important supporter of his. The introduction was entirely written by Turgot, as were some other parts, but the work was published in Huber's name only. Huber may not have been sufficiently well-versed in French at the time to produce a translation of this quality. Through this translation, Gessner became the best-known German-language poet in Europe before Goethe. Further translations into Italian and English were based on Huber's French.

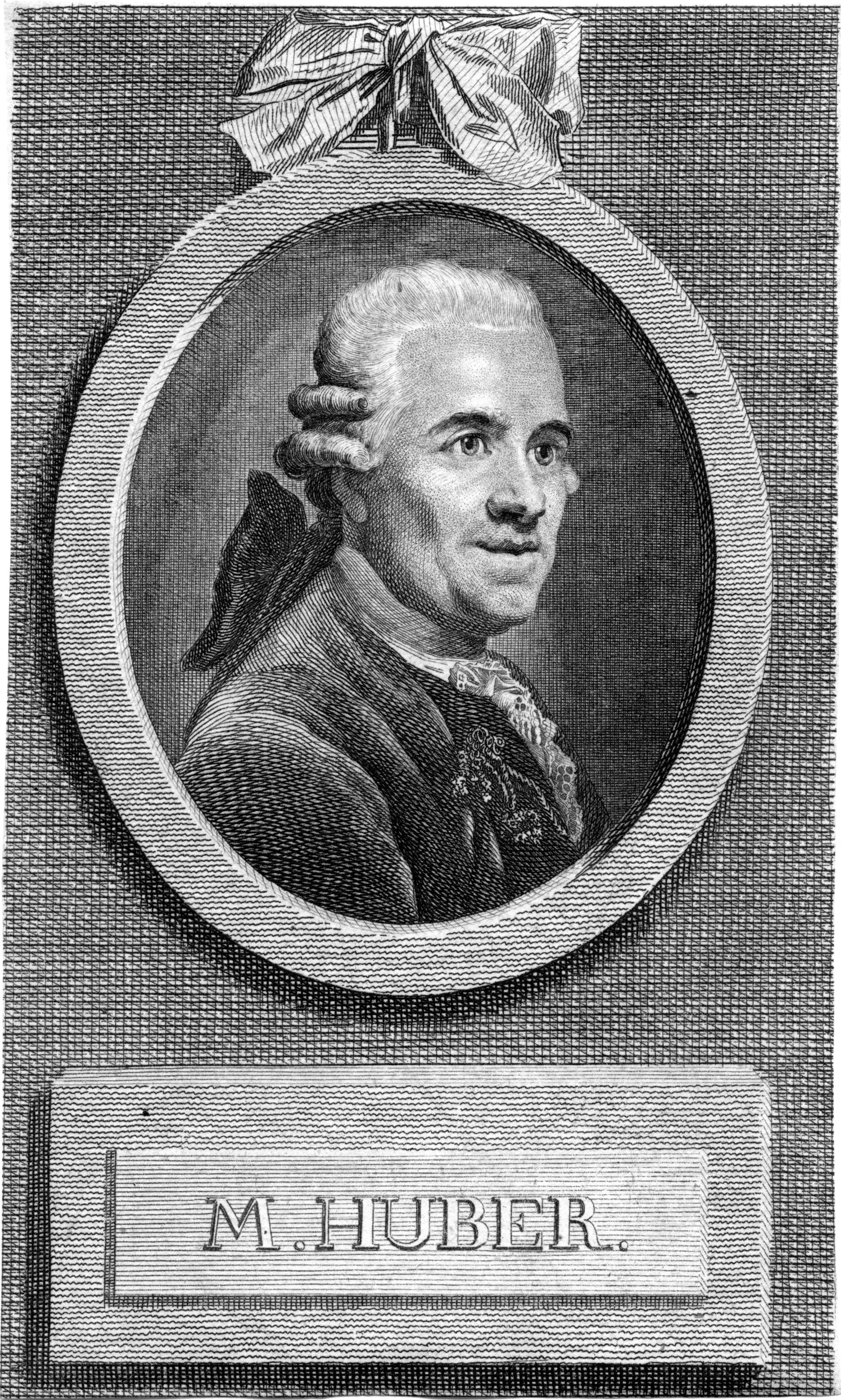
Michael Huber, engraving, before 1776

Huber was acquainted with several of the Encyclopédistes, the contributors to the Encyclopédie, a large encyclopaedia known as a major work of Enlightenment thought. Besides the Encyclopédie's editor Denis Diderot, Huber knew the philosophers Jean-Jacques Rousseau and Baron d'Holbach. His contacts also included others who worked for the Journal étranger such as Friedrich Melchior, Baron von Grimm, who edited the journal in 1754. The German-born engraver Johann Georg Wille was his closest friend, and much of what is known about Huber's time in Paris comes from Wille's diaries.

Huber published further translations of Gessner's works: in 1762 the Idylles et poëmes champêtres and in 1764 Daphnis et le premier navigateur. In 1766, he published a four-volume anthology of German poetry in French, Choix de poésies allemandes, which was described by the German scholar of French literature Hanns Heiß as Huber's most important work. Against a background of perceived French prejudices against a "barbaric" German culture, Huber tried to show the high aspirations of German poetry. The individual pieces were arranged by genre, not by author, so some authors appeared in several places. Huber gave a novel separation of German literary history into four distinct eras: the earliest began with the bards mentioned in the Germania, an ethnographic book by the Roman historian Tacitus. As none of the bards' work survives, the first poem in Huber's collection is a work of Otfrid of Weissenburg, a ninth-century monk. The second era started with Minnesang ('love song'), a German literary tradition that had flourished under the twelfth- and thirteenth-century Hohenstaufen rule, and continued with the fourteenth-to-sixteenth-century tradition of artisanal Meistersinger ('master singers'). Individual authors mentioned by Huber include Sebastian Brant, the author of the satire Ship of Fools, and Protestant reformer Martin Luther. The third era started with the seventeenth-century Silesian-born poet Martin Opitz, while the fourth and most recent era began with the Swiss polymath Albrecht von Haller and included further Enlightenment poets such as Christoph Martin Wieland and Gotthold Ephraim Lessing. Huber's overview of German literary history, the first to be available in French, was translated into German in 1768. It is considered an early milestone of theoretical scholarship into German literary history.

At an unknown date, but before 1759, Huber married the Parisian Anna-Louise l'Epine. They had six or seven children, but all except the youngest died in infancy. The only surviving son was Ludwig Ferdinand Huber, who was born in 1764 and baptised "Louis Ferdinand" in the Catholic Church of Saint André des Arcs in Paris.

== Teacher, translator and art expert in Leipzig ==
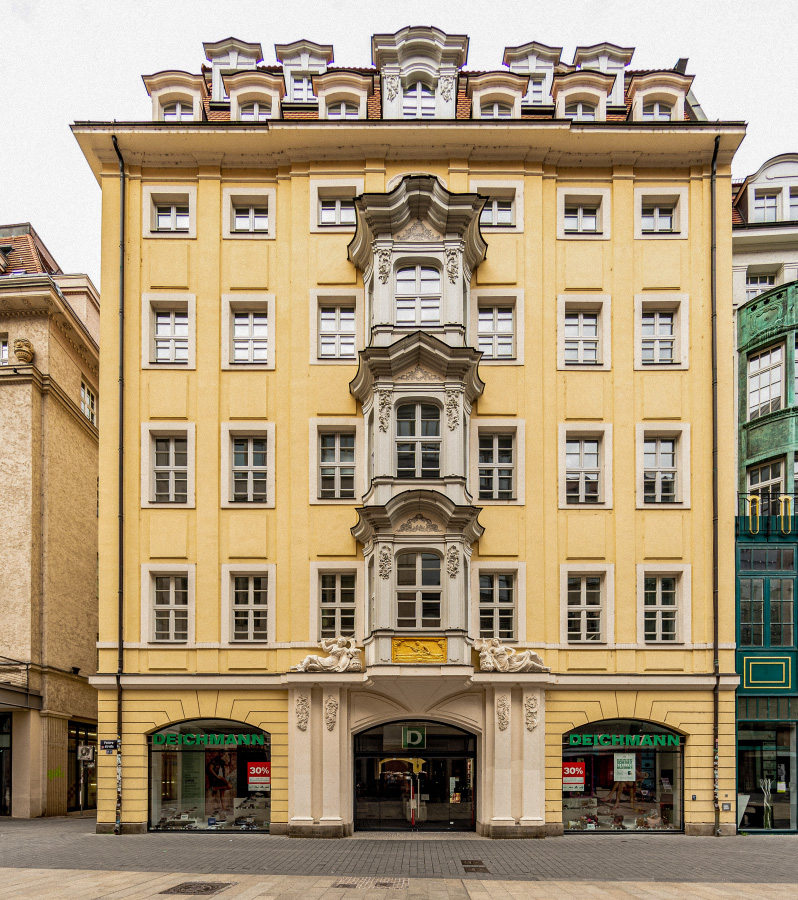
Haugk's house in Leipzig

In 1766, on the recommendation of his friends Christian Felix Weiße and Christian Ludwig von Hagedorn, Huber became the successor of Eleazar de Mauvillon as French language teacher at the University of Leipzig. As he was Catholic, he did not receive an official professorial chair from the Protestant university, but he was in favour with the Catholic court of the Electorate of Saxony and supported by the dowager Electress, Duchess Maria Antonia of Bavaria, and the regent, Prince Francis Xavier of Saxony. He was awarded the right to be called "professor" and received a salary of 300 Reichsthaler from the private funds of the Elector, the underage Frederick Augustus I of Saxony. (Note: For comparison, Huber considered the two Reichsthaler he had to pay for the family's first two nights at the inn in Leipzig during the trade fair a substantial amount of money.) When Huber and his family arrived in Leipzig, his wife spoke no German. To be able to afford the rent of 225 Reichsthaler for a sizeable apartment in Haugk's house in Petersstrasse in central Leipzig, Huber's wife had to offer catering to students for money. Huber continued to translate but also became a well-known art expert and collector of copper engravings. From 1775, Huber lived in the Leipzig house that the Elector used as a residence while visiting the city, and his wife was promised a future pension. He had many cultivated friends and was well connected in society. His contacts included the pedagogue Christian Felix Weiße, the artist Adam Friedrich Oeser, the poet Christian Fürchtegott Gellert and the art collector Christian Ludwig von Hagedorn.

In his later years, Huber turned his interests towards art history. He translated Johann Joachim Winckelmann's 1764 History of Art in Antiquity from German into French, expanded the work, and included a biography of the author. His translation appeared in three volumes in 1781 and played an important role in Winckelmann's reception in France. Huber had a collection of copper engravings and used it for teaching, giving private lectures introducing students to the arts. One of his students was the young Goethe. Huber edited several catalogues of engravings and wrote a related nine-volume work that was translated from his French manuscript and published from 1796 to 1804. (Note: The full title of the work was Handbuch für Kunstliebhaber und Sammler über die vornehmsten Kupferstecher und ihre Werke: vom Anfange dieser Kunst bis auf gegenwärtige Zeit ('Handbook for art lovers and collectors about the most noble copper engravers and their works: from the beginning of this art to the present time').) A general theory of art was included in the work, in which Huber extended some of Winckelmann's terminology and reflected on the principles for the collection of engravings.

== Final years and legacy ==
Huber's wife died in 1800. After her death, he decided to visit his son Ludwig Ferdinand, who lived in Stuttgart with his own wife, Therese Huber, and his children and step-children. Huber and his housekeeper, Christiane, arrived there on 20 May 1801. He fell ill and was only able to return on 4 August; his daughter-in-law accompanied him and Christiane on the journey back to Leipzig. In Leipzig, he recovered and returned to work, but was frail for his final years until his death on 15 April 1804.

Huber was an important cultural mediator who introduced German literature to France. He has been described as a precursor of German theoretical literary scholarship. Goethe mentioned him in his autobiography, stating "Huber, a print collector, and a well-experienced connoisseur, had furthermore the gratefully acknowledged merit of having determined to make the worth of German literature known to the French."
