= Ludwig Ferdinand Huber =

German writer and translator (1764–1804)

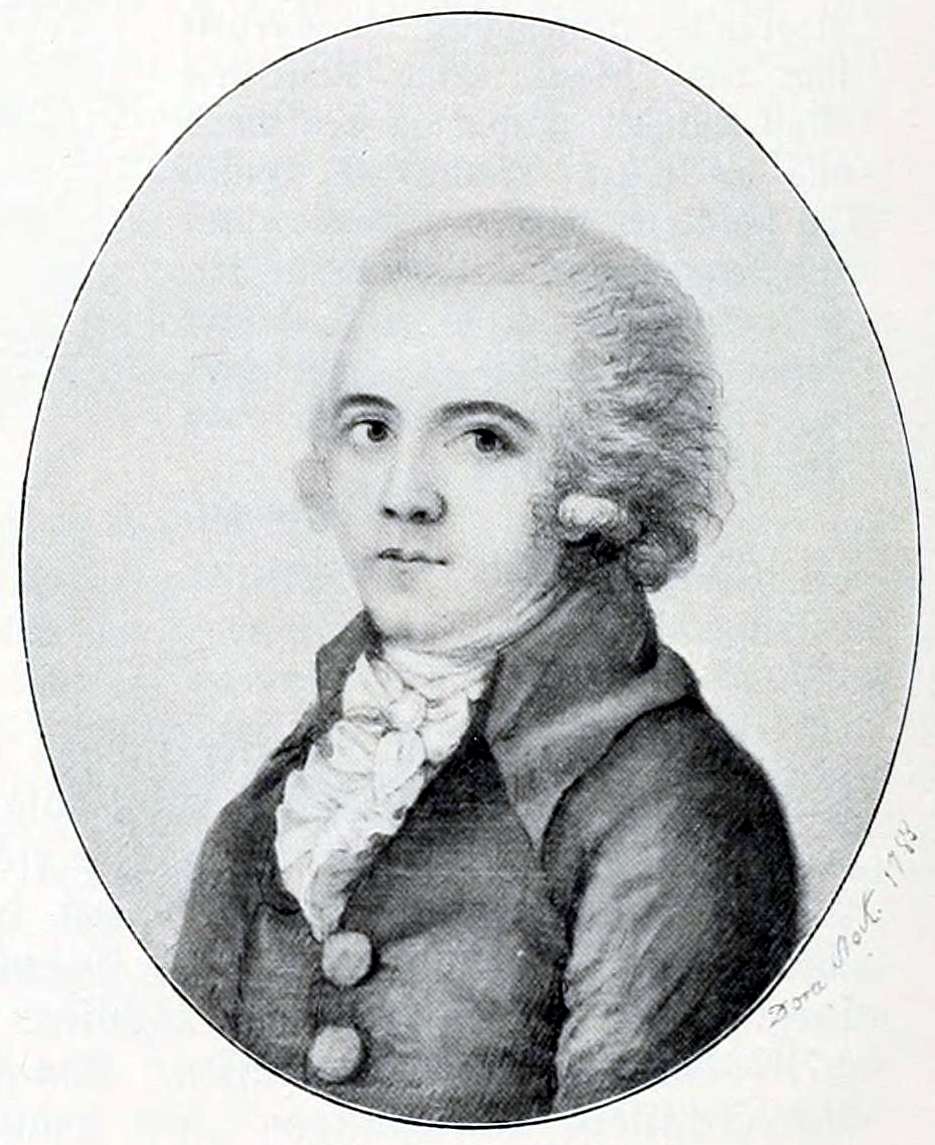
- 1788 portrait
- Born: 1764; Paris, France
- Died: 24 December 1804 (aged 40); Ulm, Electorate of Bavaria, Holy Roman Empire
- Other name: Louis Ferdinand Huber
- Occupations: Translator; diplomat; playwright; literary critic; journalist
- Spouse: Therese Forster (m. 1794)

Ludwig Ferdinand Huber or Louis Ferdinand Huber (1764 – 24 December 1804) was a German translator, diplomat, playwright, literary critic, and journalist. Born in Paris, Huber was the son of the Bavarian-born writer and translator Michael Huber and his French wife Anna Louise, née l'Epine. He grew up bilingual in French and German after his parents moved to Leipzig when he was two years old. He lacked a classical education but read voraciously and was well versed in modern languages, and started publishing translations from French and English at an early age. He also translated plays that were performed in theatres all over Germany. In the early 1780s, Huber became friends with the jurist Christian Gottfried Körner, his fiancée Minna Stock, and her older sister Dora Stock, whom he later promised to marry. Together, the friends wrote in admiration to the poet Friedrich Schiller and successfully invited him to come to Leipzig. Körner and Minna were married in 1785 and lived in Dresden, where they were joined by Dora, Schiller, and finally Huber, who shared a house with Schiller.

Huber found employment as a diplomat, and, in 1788, moved to Mainz, where he started a friendship with the world traveller Georg Forster and his wife Therese. In 1790, he became Therese's lover and moved into the Forsters' house. He wrote original plays, most notably Das heimliche Gericht ('The Secret Court'), but without much success, and turned to literary criticism. When rumours about his affair with Therese started to spread in literary circles, Huber broke his engagement with Dora, ending his friendship with Körner and damaging his relations with Schiller. When the French revolutionary army under Custine entered Mainz, Huber moved to Frankfurt, but stayed in contact with the Forsters, causing suspicion among his superiors. Therese Forster left Mainz for Strasbourg and then to the neutral Principality of Neuchâtel in present-day Switzerland, and Huber quit his diplomatic service to be with her. Georg Forster went to Paris as representative of the Republic of Mainz. After Forster agreed to a divorce, there was a final meeting of Forster with his family and Huber in Travers in November 1793, but Forster died in January 1794 before the divorce could be finalised, and Huber married Therese in April 1794. They moved to Bôle and collaborated on translations, while Huber was also active as a publicist and reviewer. He became a friend of the writer Isabelle de Charrière and translated several of her works.

In 1798, Huber returned to Germany, becoming editor in chief of Cotta's Allgemeine Zeitung in September. For political reasons, the newspaper moved from Tübingen via Stuttgart to Ulm, where Huber was given a title and an annual salary by the Elector of Bavaria in March 1804. After a journey to Leipzig and Göttingen, Huber fell ill and died in December 1804. He was mostly forgotten after his death, and was considered of interest mostly as a friend of Schiller, Forster and de Charrière. Some of his literary criticism had long-lasting importance, especially his reviews of Goethe's works.

== Family background and early life ==
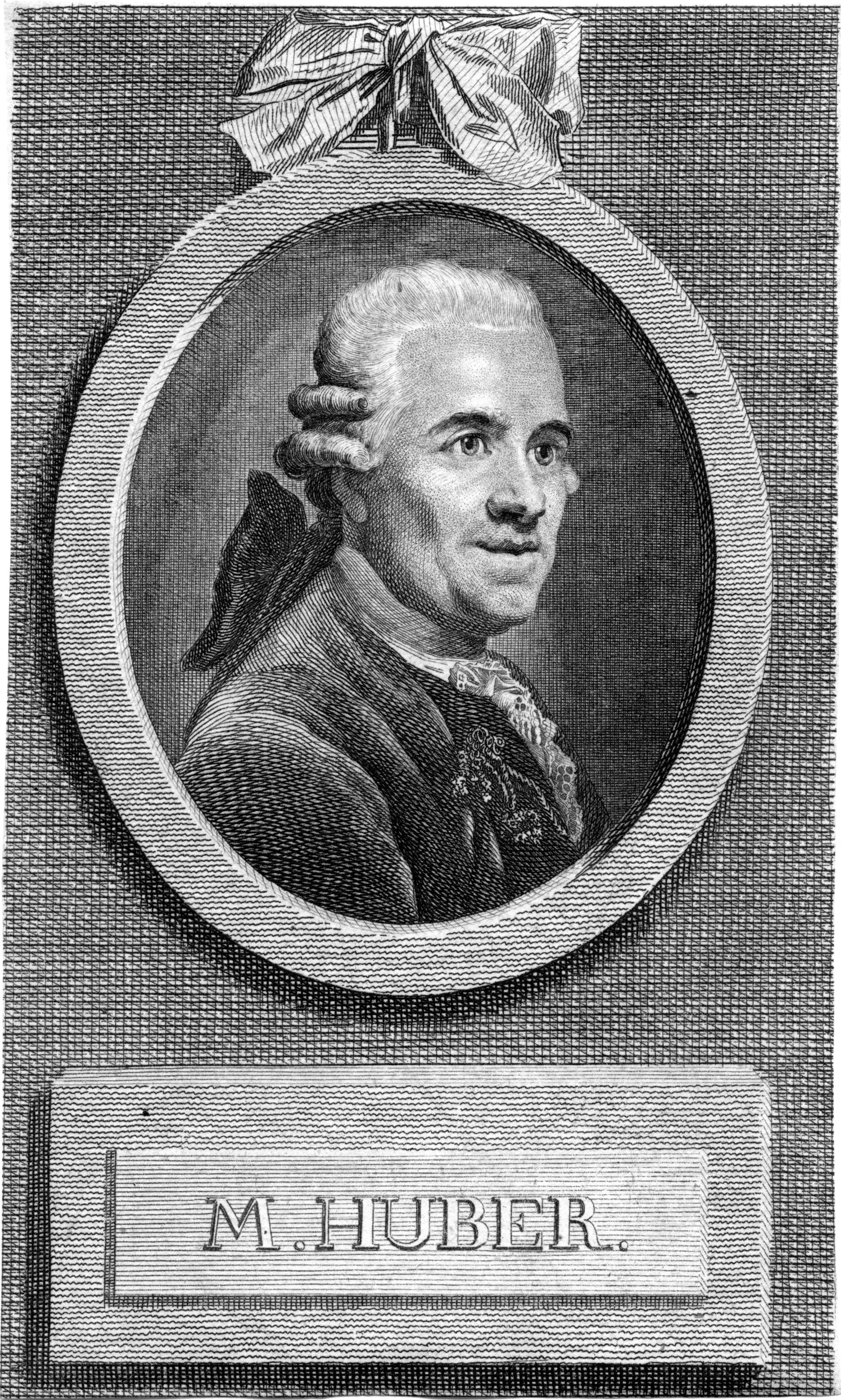
Michael Huber, engraving, before 1776

Huber was born on 15 August or 14 September 1764 in Paris. (Note: In her monograph on Huber, Sabine Dorothea Jordan states the date of birth was 15 August. She refers to an affidavit by Michael Huber in relation to his son's marriage to Therese Huber from the Goethe- und Schiller-Archiv, and states that other sources have an incorrect date of birth. This is followed by other authors. The date of 14 September is found in some older encyclopaedias. A letter from Schiller to Huber, written on 13 September 1785, mentions Huber's upcoming birthday.) His parents were Michael Huber, a Bavarian-born writer, translator, and language teacher, and his wife Anna Louise, née l'Epine. His father had emigrated to France, where he worked as a translator and language teacher. His French translation of Salomon Gessner's The Death of Abel that appeared in 1759 was very successful, and he became a regular contributor to the Journal étranger. Little is known about Huber's French mother; his parents were married before c. 1759 and several of their children died in infancy before Huber's birth. The child was baptised Louis Ferdinand in the Catholic Church of Saint André des Arcs; one godparent was the wife of Michael Huber's friend Johann Georg Wille, a German-born artist and engraver. The father had no reliable source of income in Paris. When the position of a teacher of French at the University of Leipzig became available in 1766, he was happy to accept an offer that had been mediated by the art historian and diplomat Christian Ludwig von Hagedorn and the writer Christian Felix Weiße. The Huber family left for Leipzig in September 1766.

Huber, who was still called Louis Ferdinand by his family, grew up bilingual in French and German in culture-rich surroundings. His father had many connections to Leipzig society, including to the artist Adam Friedrich Oeser, who had influenced the young Johann Wolfgang von Goethe, as well as to poet Christian Fürchtegott Gellert. Michael Huber also had a large collection of engravings that attracted visitors and was mentioned in Goethe's autobiographical Dichtung und Wahrheit, and he became known as an art expert. Nevertheless, he was never financially well off, and as a Catholic, could not obtain a formal chair at the Protestant university. Huber's mother offered regular dinners for paying students interested in improving their French. This was not a very lucrative business, but it provided interesting company. Huber also learned English during this time; it is likely that he was instructed in speaking and conversation by one of his parents' boarders.

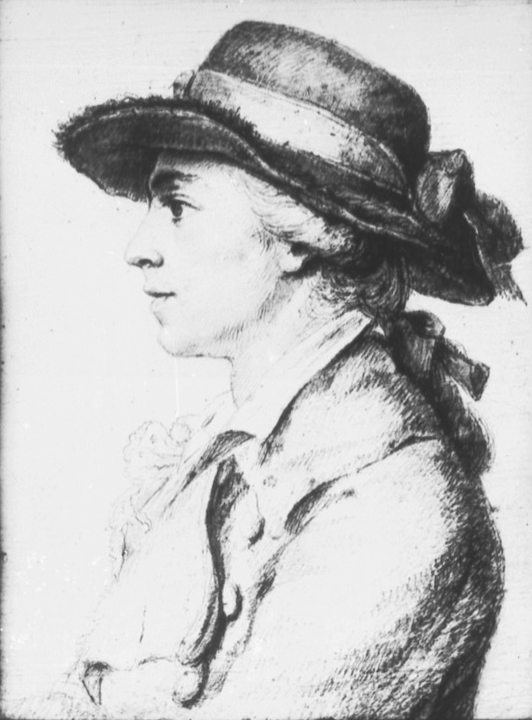
Ludwig Ferdinand Huber. Silverpoint drawing by Dora Stock, 1788

Huber's mother was overprotective of her only surviving child and kept the boy from all physical exercise for years after a slight accident at the age of eight. Huber never learned to ride on horseback or to dance, and was physically awkward all his life, except while playing billiards or during theatrical productions. His education was unsystematic; he read voraciously the books in his father's house, most of which were in French, and became highly knowledgeable in some fields while missing out on others that would have been expected from an educated young person in his time. Huber had no instruction in Ancient Greek and classical antiquity, he lacked knowledge of music or natural sciences, and he had no religious education nor any interest in religious questions. On the other hand, he knew foreign languages and was enthusiastic about literature; in addition to English, French, and German, he could read Italian. He was especially enthusiastic about William Shakespeare's plays.

While still in his teens, Huber began working on translations. In 1782, his translation of the second French edition of Louise d'Épinay's Les Conversations d'Émilie was published in Leipzig by Siegfried Leberecht Crusius. He next translated Colley Cibber's comedy Love Makes a Man from English into German. Huber's adaptation was performed by the theatre company of Pasquale Bondini and Joseph Seconda in Leipzig in 1783, without much success, and subsequently printed in Berlin in 1784. His next work was a translation of Telèphe, en douze livres by Jean de Pechméja, appearing with Crusius in 1784. His 1785 play Ethelwolf oder der König kein König, an adaptation of A King and No King appeared together with comments about the authors Beaumont and Fletcher and their era, and was performed several times in Mannheim and Berlin. In the same year, he published one of several translations of the Pierre Beaumarchais play La Folle Journée, ou Le Mariage de Figaro, which was successfully performed in Leipzig by Bondini–Seconda but met with critical disapproval. Huber's translations were very literal, including literal translations of idiomatic expressions.

== Friendship with Körner and Schiller ==
Drawings by Dora Stock sent to Schiller in 1784
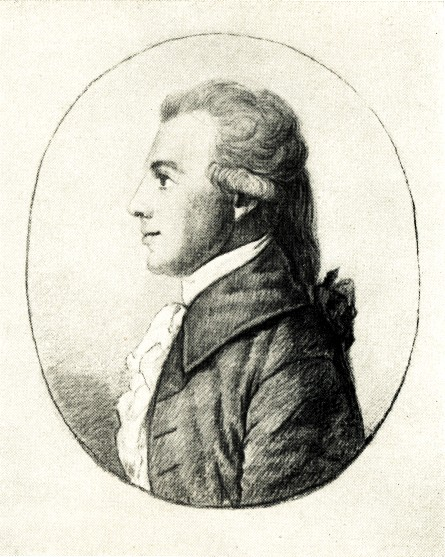
Christian Gottfried Körner

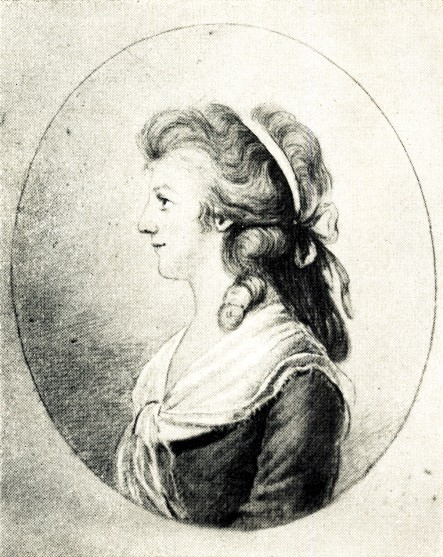
Minna Stock

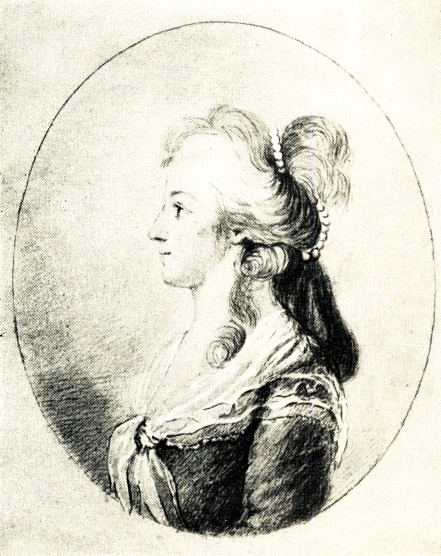
Dora Stock

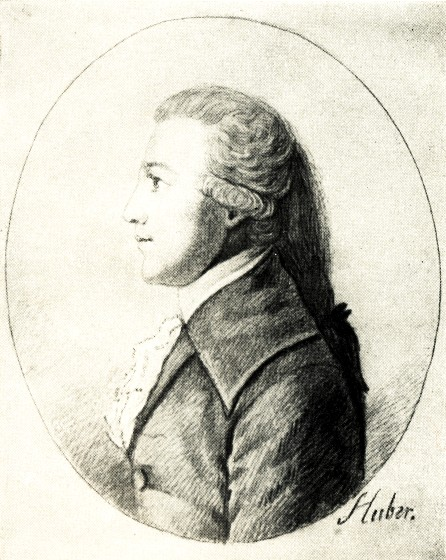
Ludwig Ferdinand Huber

From c. 1782, Huber formed a close friendship with the jurist Christian Gottfried Körner, his fiancée Minna Stock, and her older sister Dora Stock. Dora and Minna were the daughters of the engraver Johann Michael Stock, and Dora became a well-known painter. Minna was said to be very beautiful, while Dora was short with a slightly curved spine, but a lively temperament. Körner obtained an administrative position at the Consistory in Dresden in 1783 and had to move there, but often visited Leipzig.

In 1784, the four friends read Friedrich Schiller's play The Robbers and decided to write to the author, with whom they were not personally acquainted. Together with letters of admiration, the longest of which was by Huber, they sent a purse embroidered by Minna, a musical adaptation of a Schiller poem by Körner, and four sketches depicting the friends by Dora. Schiller was delighted, but only answered a few months later, asking for help and a place to stay as he felt unable to continue his life in Mannheim. Körner inherited his father's fortune in January 1785 and was able to invite Schiller to Leipzig. Schiller was met by Huber when he arrived on 17 April 1785, an event that Huber later described as one of the most influential of his early life.

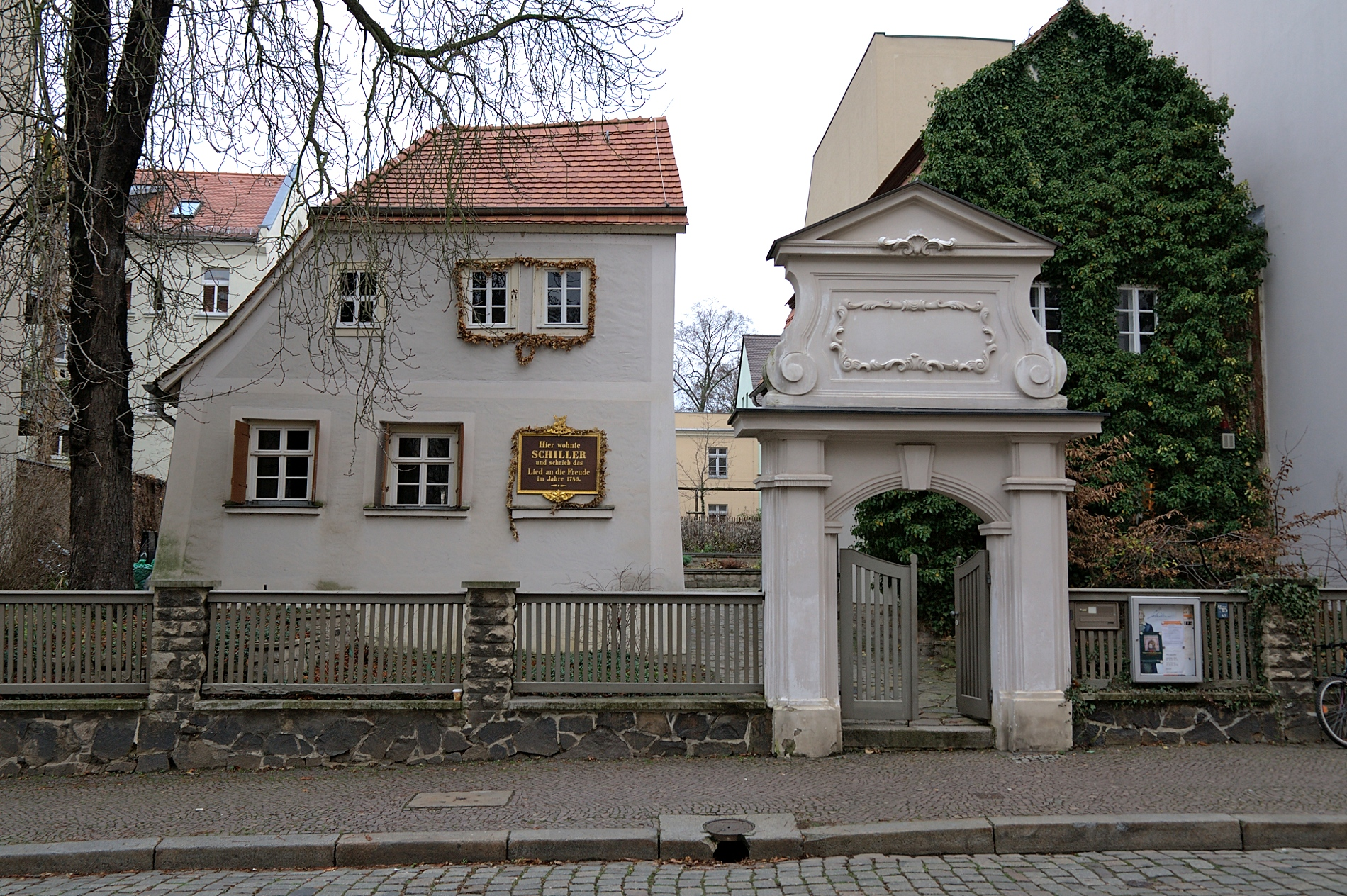
Schillerhaus in Gohlis

The two and the Stock sisters quickly became friends, and after two weeks of introducing Schiller to many of the city's artists and intellectuals, they all moved to the village of Gohlis just north of Leipzig, where Schiller lived in a farmhouse that became known as the Schillerhaus. The young publisher Georg Joachim Göschen soon joined them.

Huber became engaged to Dora Stock around this time, agreeing to marry her once he had the means. On 7 August 1785, Körner and Minna were married, and Dora soon moved to their Dresden household. Schiller also moved to Dresden in September 1785, leaving Huber behind in Leipzig. On the initiative of Huber's parents, the Saxony minister Heinrich Gottlieb von Stutterheim agreed to help their son to find employment in the diplomatic service. Huber then also moved to Dresden, where he lived together with Schiller, in a house owned by the court gardener Fleischmann and close to the Körner city residence on Kohlmarkt. From time to time, he met with von Stutterheim to improve his communication skills for interacting at court, but he did very little to build connections that could lead to a diplomatic appointment.

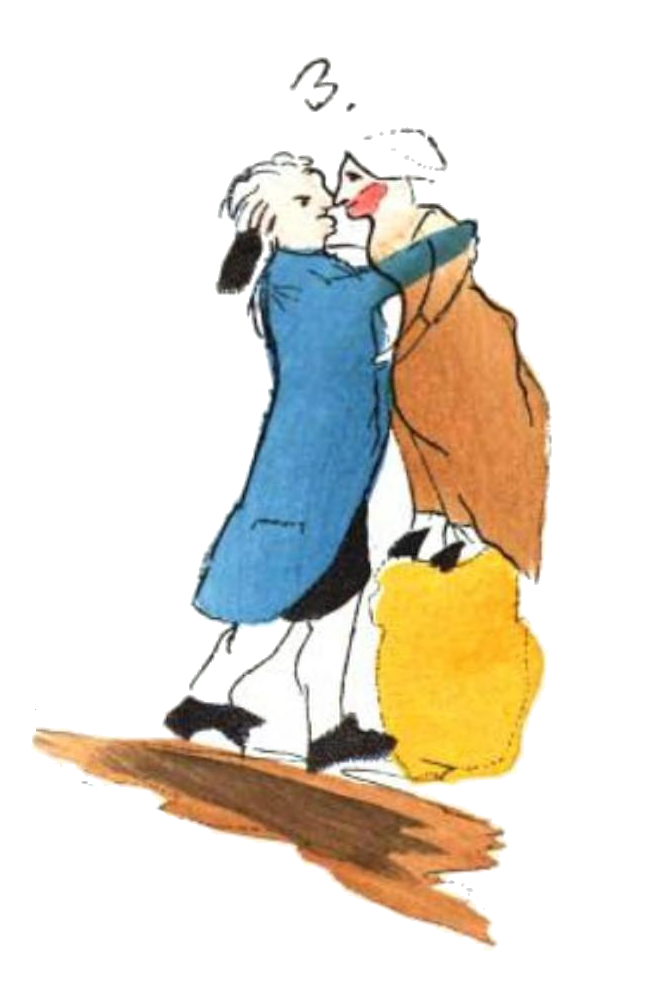
A tender embrace between Huber and Dorchen, watercolour by Friedrich Schiller depicting Huber and Dora, from a book by Schiller and Huber made for Körner's 30th birthday

For Körner's 30th birthday, Huber and Schiller worked together on a small book, Avanturen des neuen Telemachs oder Leben und Exsertionen Körners, with watercolours painted by Schiller and texts written by Huber that humorously depicted the Körners and their friends. The booklet was first reprinted in 1862 and not included in any edition of Schiller's works. The manuscript, considered lost at the end of the 19th century, is now in the Beinecke Rare Book & Manuscript Library.

In Schiller's magazine Thalia, Huber published an essay in 1786 on the topic of greatness, and he later became one of the most important contributors to the journal. In 1787, Schiller moved to Weimar; Huber adapted Dumaniant's play Guerre ouverte, ou Ruse contre ruse into German as Offne Fehde. After its premiere, directed by Friedrich Ludwig Schröder, it was performed more than a hundred times, including seventeen performances at Weimar while Goethe was the theatre director there.

In the autumn of 1787, Huber found employment: he was appointed secretary to the legation of Saxony in the Electorate of Mainz, a solid employment with the hope for further career advances as a diplomat. While his parents, his fiancée, and other friends were happy, Schiller saw this as a waste of Huber's literary talents. In 1788, Huber joined a Masonic lodge, Minerva zu den drei Palmen in Leipzig, where Körner had been a member since 1777. Schiller was surprised and somewhat taken aback by his friends' Masonic activities.

== Diplomat in Mainz ==
To take up his new employment in Mainz, Huber travelled via Leipzig, Weimar and Frankfurt. He visited his parents in Leipzig and saw Schiller in Weimar. In Frankfurt, he met Goethe's mother Catharina Elisabeth Goethe, who liked him and provided him with a copy of the prose version of her son's play Iphigenia in Tauris. He then arrived in Mainz on 21 April 1788. At first, he was isolated and had difficulties making friends. He was dissatisfied with the monotony of his work, which included copying and decoding messages. After he complained in a letter to Schiller, he received a response admonishing him not to give up in the face of difficulties and praising him for the earlier scenes of Huber's play Das heimliche Gericht, which had been published in three issues of Thalia. Schiller stated that many people thought he was the play's author. Huber was thrilled by this response, and not only successfully applied for help reducing his workload but also continued working on his drama. However, Schiller later described the play as wordy and incoherent.

The world traveller Georg Forster with his wife Therese and their young daughter, also named Therese, arrived in Mainz on 2 October 1788, where Forster took up the position of librarian at the university. Huber had a "plan of conquest" to win their friendship and helped the Forsters settle in the new city. Their first impression of Huber was not the best; they were especially irritated by his habit of using extensive quotations while speaking. Nevertheless, he ended up as Forster's protégé. Huber finished Das heimliche Gericht in 1789, and it was published in 1790 by Göschen. Featuring knights, a secret society and a secret court, the play was strongly influenced by Goethe's Götz von Berlichingen. Huber first asked Schröder in Hamburg to perform it, but after Schröder asked for a happy ending, the project was dropped. The play premiered on 11 February 1790 in the Mannheim National Theatre under the direction of Wolfgang Heribert von Dalberg, with actors including August Wilhelm Iffland and Heinrich Beck. Forster and Huber were in attendance and only discovered during the performance that Dalberg had rewritten the ending. The play was not successful, and Huber was not paid his dues. Reviews of the play were mostly negative, except for a review in the Göttingische Gelehrte Anzeigen. This anonymous review was written by August Wilhelm Schlegel, but Huber incorrectly assumed that Christian Gottlob Heyne, Therese Forster's father, was the author. Modern reception has described the play as "weak", with characters lacking in depth and full of unintentional humour. Following advice by the Forsters, Huber started to read more about history, which led to the publication of translations of the memories of Jean François Paul de Gondi and Charles Pinot Duclos. He also started to help Forster with translations, for example on Shakuntala, although his contribution was small and unacknowledged. Forster was critical of Huber's deliberately very literal translations, but Huber's point of view was that it should be possible to recover the original words from the translation.

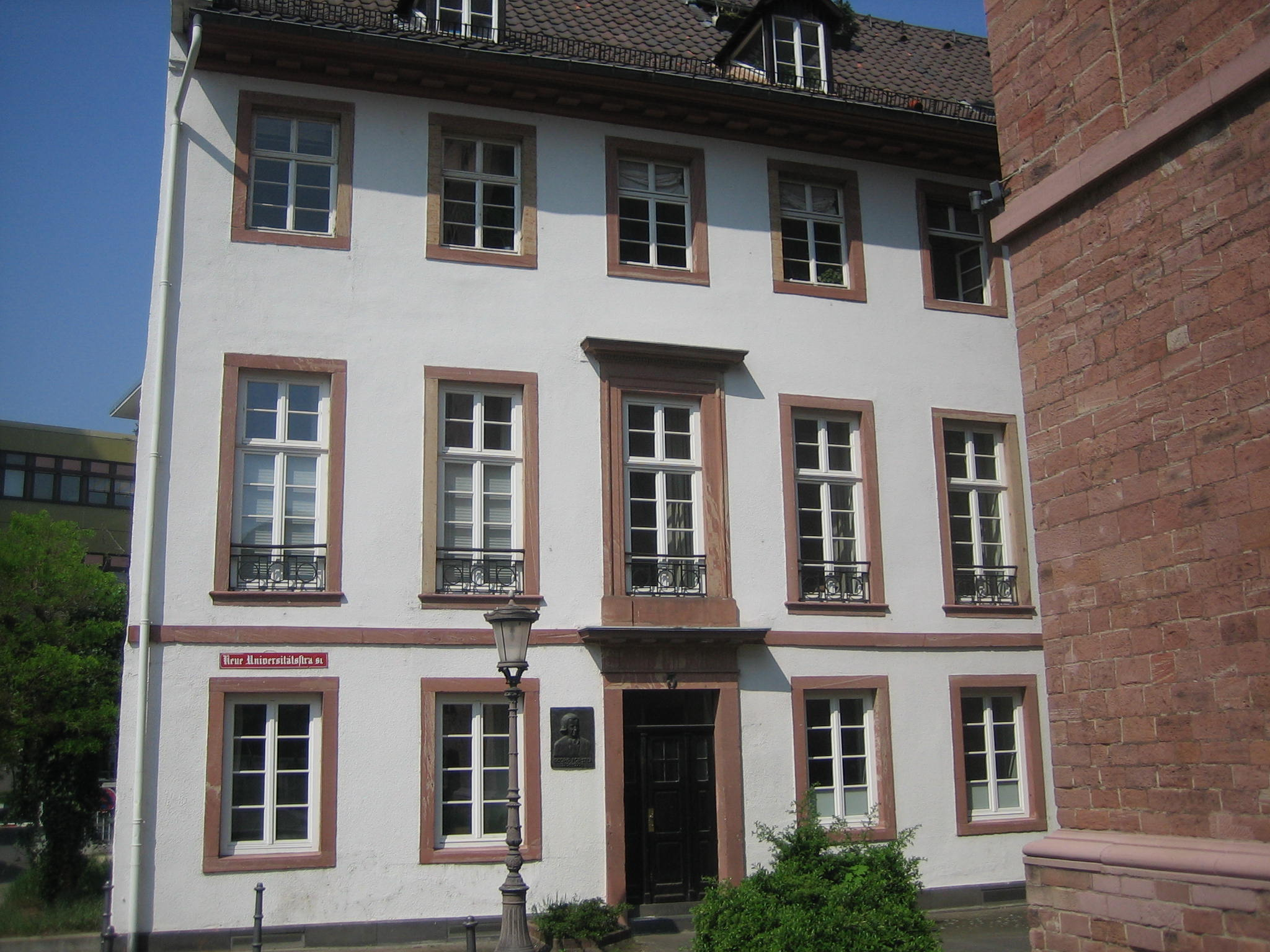
The house in which the Forster family and later also Huber lived in Mainz

In March 1790, Forster and Alexander von Humboldt went on a journey along the Rhine, to the Low Countries, and to England, returning in July. During this time, Huber and Therese Forster became lovers. Forster did not break with Huber but accepted living in a ménage à trois. Huber moved into the house of the Forsters in autumn 1790 as their lodger. Therese had two further children, Luise and Georg, born in 1791 and 1792, but both died within a few months. There is no conclusive proof as to who was their father, but Forster seems to have thought they were Huber's, as he commented after their deaths, "Huber's children do not live". Huber did not reveal his relationship with Therese to his fiancée Dora. Also in 1790, Huber became the most senior diplomatic representative of Saxony in the Electorate of Mainz after his superior returned to Dresden. Huber wrote a second play, Juliane, which was influenced by Therese and first published in Thalia in 1791.

From February 1791, Huber contributed reviews to the Jena-based Allgemeine Literatur-Zeitung, the most important German literary review journal at the time, making him known as a literary critic and journalist. When Goethe visited Mainz in August 1792, he spent two evenings with the Forsters and friends, including Huber and Samuel Thomas von Sömmerring. According to the Goethe expert Thomas P. Saine, the description of these events in Goethe's 1820 autobiographical novel Campagne in Frankreich is partially based on a letter of Huber to Körner that was published in 1806 in which he compares Goethe and his mother. After Huber had written a quite negative review of the Göttingen philosophy professor Friedrich Bouterwek's novel Donamar in 1791, Bouterwek wrote a lengthy and vulgar poem about a Huberus Murzuphlus, pointing towards Huber's affair with Therese that was increasingly a topic of gossip. Just before this poem appeared in the autumn of 1792 in the Göttinger Musenalmanach for 1793, Huber had finally declared the breaking of his engagement to Dora, who had still been expecting Huber to marry her. This ended his friendship with Körner and seriously damaged his friendship with Schiller; he never saw Dora Stock again.

== French occupation of Mainz and resignation from service ==
On 20 September 1792, the French Revolutionary Army won a victory in the Battle of Valmy, and soon after, troops under Adam Philippe, Comte de Custine invaded Germany. On 4 October, the Elector fled the city, and Huber followed orders to move the Saxon legation's archives to Frankfurt to save them from the French. However, he was unwilling to be separated from Therese and returned to Mainz on 13 October. His superiors were suspicious of his actions and of his association with Forster, who was known to be sympathetic to the revolution. Mainz capitulated after a short siege, and Custine entered the city on 21 October. Soon after, Frankfurt was also occupied by French troops. Huber was reprimanded for his return to Mainz and ordered back to Frankfurt, where he arrived on 22 or 23 October. Forster became a member of the Mainz Jacobin Club on 10 November and became the Vice President of the French administration on 19 November. After Huber's next visit to Mainz, he was considered a potential spy carrying information to the Forsters and ordered to stay in Frankfurt. He met the Forsters and their lodger, Thomas Brand, again on 29 November, in Höchst, and Huber promised to Forster to take care of Therese and the family if necessary. On 2 December, Frankfurt was retaken by Prussian and Hessian troops. Huber was not harmed, but was horrified by the bloodshed. Therese Forster and her children left Mainz on 7 December, accompanied by Brand, and travelled to Strasbourg and from there in early January 1793 to Neuchâtel.

Huber and Therese planned that she should divorce Forster, which was possible in revolutionary France by a simple declaration of both partners in front of a judge, so they would be able to marry. Huber tried to resign from the Saxon diplomatic service, which was not a straightforward matter, as he did not explain his true motivations. When he was allowed to leave Frankfurt, he went to Leipzig to see his parents, and then to Dresden in April 1793. After confiding in a government official that the reason for his resignation was the desire to be with Therese, he finally succeeded in obtaining his discharge, and he travelled to Neuchâtel, where he arrived in July 1793. In the meantime, Forster had left Mainz for Paris in March 1793 to petition for the accession of the newly founded Republic of Mainz to the French First Republic. Mainz had soon after come under siege by Prussian and Austrian troops and capitulated on 23 July 1793, making it impossible for Forster to return.

== Exile in Switzerland ==
In Neuchâtel, Therese Forster enjoyed the protection of the influential politician Georges de Rougemont, who had known her since his student days in Göttingen. Huber obtained a temporary residence permit as a citizen of Saxony. They lived separately and carefully avoided being seen together in public. Neuchâtel was at the time a neutral territory but administered by Prussia. An advantage to the two was that Forster, who had become a French citizen, could not stay there. Forster finally agreed to a divorce in October 1793, and arranged to meet Huber and his family in Pontarlier in France, close to the Swiss border. However, Therese could not legally enter France and refused to cross the border, and so Forster crossed the border instead, and they all met in Travers in Switzerland from 4 to 5 November 1793. Forster implored the others to live with him in Paris after the divorce. Huber gave papers to Forster that implicated Nicolas Luckner of conspiring with Lafayette, which Forster could have used to justify his trip to Switzerland if it had aroused suspicion in Paris. Before the divorce could be finalised, Forster died on 10 January 1794 in Paris. Huber married Therese on 10 April 1794. After an intervention by the Neuchâtel secret police, the couple moved to Bôle, where their daughter Luise was born on 7 March 1795. (Note: In older sources, Luise's birthday is stated to have been in February.) French became the family language.

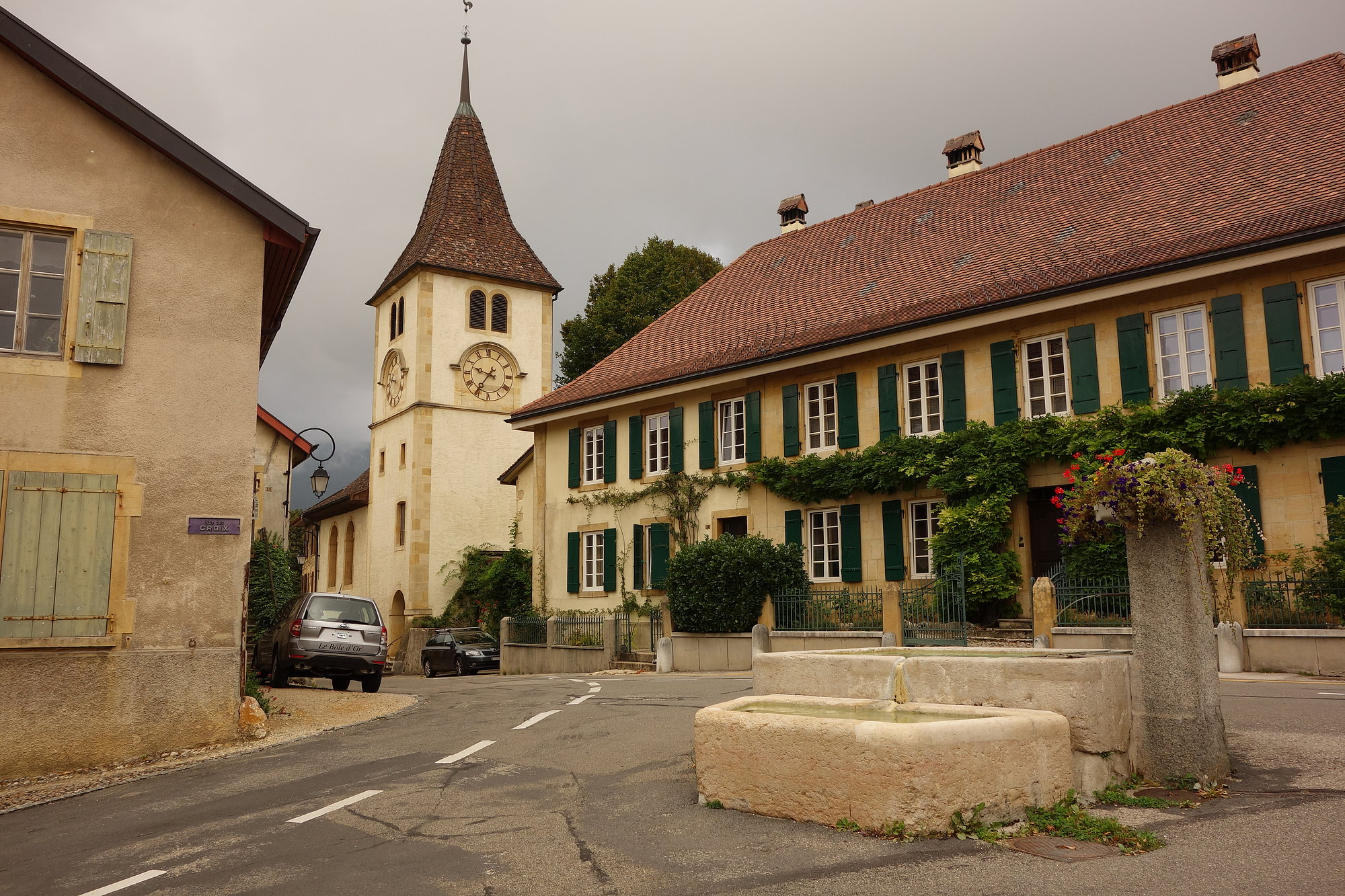
On the right: 22–24 rue du Temple, Bôle, where the Huber family lived.

The couple collaborated on translations or adaptations of a further eighteen plays between 1793 and 1804, as well as novels and political treatises from French and English. In the hope of earning more money from them, Huber also re-published his plays and essays and edited the final volume of Forster's travelogue Ansichten vom Niederrhein. He also published his journal, the Friedens-Präliminarien (Preliminaries of Peace) and edited Klio, a political and historical journal founded by Paul Usteri. Therese also wrote her first novel, Adventures on a Journey to New Holland, which appeared at first under Ludwig Ferdinand Huber's name, as did all her works until his death. Isabelle de Charrière, who had met Therese in Neuchâtel, became a supportive friend, and Huber translated and published several of her works, later becoming the most important agent for de Charrière's reception in Germany. Like Forster, de Charrière was critical of Huber's very literal translations and helped him improve his writing style. They also collaborated on a translation of Huber's Das heimliche Gericht into French, as Huber was dissatisfied with the existing one by Jean Nicolas Étienne de Bock, but this project was never finished. Some of her works were published in German in Huber's translations before they were published in French. Together with de Charrière and her friend Benjamin Constant, Huber started studying the works of German philosopher Immanuel Kant and translated some of them into French, although he found them difficult to understand. In 1795, Huber translated an excerpt of Kant's Perpetual Peace: A Philosophical Sketch into French, which appeared anonymously in January 1796 in Le Moniteur Universel. Two more children were born in Bôle, Sophie and Emanuel, but both died young.

In 1796, Huber reviewed de Sade's novel Justine for Usteri's journal Humaniora. In his widely read and extensive text, Ueber ein merkwürdiges Buch, 'About a Peculiar Book', Huber saw beyond the book's pornographic content and considered its underlying principles and social context. He saw it not just as a literary phenomenon, but attempted to use it to understand the revolutionary history, and he used the revolutionary context to explain the book's great commercial success. Huber read Justine as a parable on the philosophy of the French Revolution, and compared the excesses in the book with those of revolutionary terror. The review is slightly ambiguous in whether Justine represents a revolutionary or a counter-revolutionary spirit. It is the only one of Huber's reviews in which he considers the social and historical context of a literary work, and has been described as a masterpiece of literary criticism.

== Journalist in Germany ==
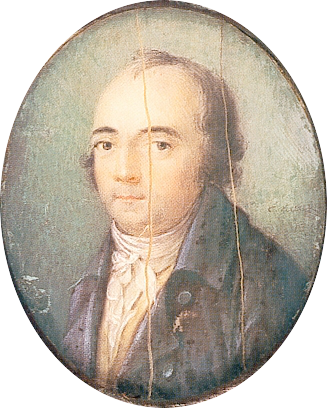
Ludwig Ferdinand Huber, miniature by Karl Ludwig Kaaz, 1801

For the publisher Johann Friedrich Cotta, Huber had edited and contributed to the monthly journal Flora since 1794. When Cotta started a political daily newspaper, the Neueste Weltkunde in 1798, he soon offered Huber the position of assistant editor. This brought financial stability, and Huber moved to Tübingen in March 1798, with his family following in May. For reasons related to censorship, Cotta moved the newspaper office to Stuttgart, where it appeared as Allgemeine Zeitung from September 1798. Huber became editor-in-chief and moved to Stuttgart, followed by his family. As editor, he was a fast worker who got along well with Cotta. He successfully consolidated the Allgemeine Zeitung and led it away from its previous pro-revolutionary tendencies. In October 1798, Huber's daughter Adele was born, followed on 10 March 1800 by Victor Aimé Huber, his only son to survive him.

Huber continued to write for the Allgemeine Literatur-Zeitung. In 1799, he wrote a positive review of Christoph Friedrich Nicolai's satirical epistolary novel Vertraute Briefe von Adelheid B** an ihre Freundin Julie S**. The novel was written as an attack on the literary movement of Jena Romanticism and mocked especially the brothers August Wilhelm and Friedrich Schlegel. Against the advice of Therese, who had been friends with August's wife Caroline, Huber joined in the attack on the Schlegels, starting a literary scandal. August Schlegel stopped contributing to the Allgemeine Literatur-Zeitung, and other Romanticists also broke with the journal. Huber next wrote a critical review of the Schlegels' literary magazine Athenaeum. The reviews were published anonymously, but Huber wrote to August Schlegel to announce it. Caroline replied to the letter and later to the review, mentioning her husband's earlier positive review Das heimliche Gericht and attacking Huber as incompetent due to his lack of classical education. In May 1800, Huber's critical review of Friedrich Schlegel's novel Lucinde appeared, furthering the dispute that finally contributed to the split of the Allgemeine Literatur-Zeitung into two magazines, one appearing in Halle and one in Jena. In retribution, Friedrich Schlegel ridiculed Huber in an epigram that appeared in the Berlin journal Kronos in 1801.

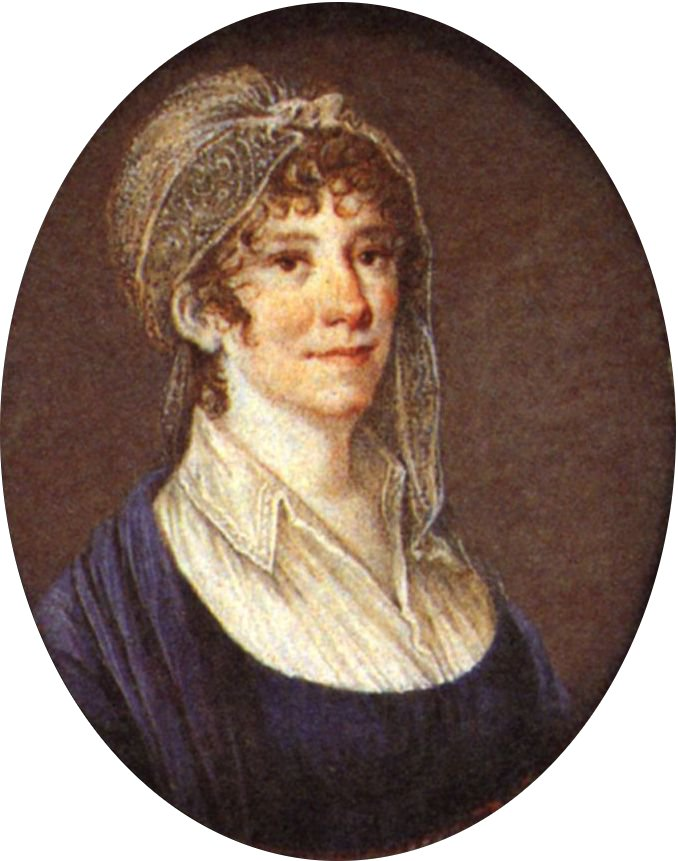
Therese Huber, miniature by Johannes Schreiber, 1804

In October 1800, Huber's mother died, and the following year, his father, Michael Huber, came to Stuttgart to visit the family. In July 1801, Huber's stepdaughter Therese Forster was sent to live with de Charrière at her Le Pontet mansion in Colombier, to prepare her for future employment as a governess. This arrangement benefitted both sides, with Forster receiving more education than was possible in her home and de Charrière enjoying her support, which lifted her depressive mood. The Allgemeine Zeitung was under some pressure from censorship in the Duchy of Württemberg, and Cotta resolved the difficulties by moving the newspaper offices to Ulm in the Electorate of Bavaria, where it appeared from 17 November 1803. Huber himself moved to Ulm immediately. In March 1804, he was given a title and an annual salary that came with a future pension by the Elector of Bavaria. His family followed to Ulm after the birth of Clemence Huber, who then died only a few weeks old. In August, the five-year-old Adele also died.

In September 1804, Huber obtained leave to travel from Cotta to settle the estate of his father, who had died in April. He travelled not just to Leipzig, but also saw his father-in-law Heyne in Göttingen and met with business contacts in Berlin, returning to Ulm in November. During his absence, his step-daughter Claire became engaged to the Swiss forestry administrator Gottlieb von Greyerz. In the middle of December, Huber fell ill, and none of the doctors that were called could help. On 24 December at 3 a.m., Huber died, possibly from tuberculosis combined with pneumonia and liver necrosis. He was buried in the Catholic cemetery in nearby Söflingen next to his children.

== Reception and legacy ==
While Huber was well known in literary circles in his time, he was mostly forgotten after his death. As a dramatist, he had no lasting importance. Nevertheless, Das heimliche Gericht inspired several novels and plays on the topic of vehmic courts. Huber is most well known for his friendship with Schiller, which features in most of the latter's biographies, and for his involvement in the demise of Georg and Therese Forster's marriage. The breaking of his engagement with Dora Stock and the subsequent estrangement with Körner and Schiller led to a negative portrayal in Schiller's letters and in subsequent scholarship. Goethe's autobiography Dichtung und Wahrheit mentions both Huber's father and the Stock sisters, but passes by the opportunity to mention Huber. Schiller scholars typically portrayed Huber as weak and egoistical, as did several historical novels about Georg Forster.

In the 1890s, the correspondence of Schiller and Huber was published, and Ludwig Geiger edited Huber's comments on the Xenien of Goethe and Schiller. Geiger later wrote a biography of Therese Huber, which included content on Ludwig Ferdinand Huber. Both as translator and as supportive journalist, Huber was a crucial agent for the distribution of de Charrière's work in Germany. As a friend of de Charrière, Huber was studied by scholars interested in her circle, for example, in a monograph by Philippe Godet. His literary criticism has also received attention, and his 1792 review of Göschen's first edition of Goethe's works in the Allgemeine Literaturzeitung has been influential in the Goethe reception during and after the Romantic era, and his comparison of Goethe to Proteus has been called a leitmotif in the history of his reception. The phrase marmorglatt und marmorkalt (as smooth and cold as marble) from Huber's review of Goethe's The Natural Daughter has become proverbial and appears in Georg Büchmann's influential collection of quotes and catchphrases, Geflügelte Worte.

== Original plays and collected works ==
A complete bibliography of Huber's works including translations and a list of known performances of his plays can be found in Sabine Jordan's monograph.

- Das heimliche Gericht: ein Trauerspiel (in German). Leipzig: G.J. Goeschen. 1790.
  - French translation: Le tribunal secret, drame historique, en cinq actes, précédeé d'une notice sur cet étrange établissement (in French). Translated by de Bock, Jean Nicolas Étienne. Metz: Claude Lamort. 1791.
- Vermischte Schriften von dem Verfasser des heimlichen Gerichts (in German). Vol. I. Berlin: Voss. 1793.
- Vermischte Schriften von dem Verfasser des heimlichen Gerichts (in German). Vol. II. Berlin: Voss. 1793.
- Juliane: ein Lustspiel in drei Aufzügen (in German). Berlin: Voss. 1794. ISBN 978-3-598-51290-2.
- Ludwig Ferdinand Huber's sämtliche Werke seit dem Jahre 1802: nebst seiner Biographie (in German). Vol. I. Tübingen: Cotta. 1806.
- Ludwig Ferdinand Huber's sämtliche Werke seit dem Jahre 1802 (in German). Vol. II. Tübingen: Cotta. 1810.
- Hubers gesammelte Erzählungen, fortgesetzt von Therese Huber, geborene Heyne (in German). Vol. III. Stuttgart and Tübingen: Cotta. 1819.
- Hubers gesammelte Erzählungen, fortgesetzt von Therese Huber, geborene Heyne (in German). Vol. IV. Stuttgart and Tübingen: Cotta. 1819.

== Sources ==
- Adelung, Johann Christoph (1784). Allgemeines Verzeichniß neuer Bücher mit kurzen Anmerkungen und einem gelehrten Anzeiger (redigirt von Johann Christoph Adelung.) (in German). Leipzig: Crusius.
- Bodi, Leslie (1966). Introduction. Adventures on a journey to New Holland, and the lonely deathbed. By Huber, Therese. Melbourne: Lansdowne Press. OCLC 470151003.
- Bohnengel, Juliane (10 December 2018). "'Ich verzweifelte lange, Ihnen Justine besorgen zu können.' Zur Zirkulation von de Sades erstem veröffentlichten Roman in Deutschland um 1800". Das Achtzehnte Jahrhundert. 42 (2): 260–274. ISBN 978-3-8353-4253-8. ISSN 0722-740X.
- Börnchen, Stefan (4 January 2021). "Psyche im Farbenfluss. Schillers Avanturen des neuen Telemachs". "Alles ist eins" (in German). Paderborn: Brill Fink. pp. 287–343. doi:10.30965/9783846763698_008. ISBN 978-3-8467-6369-8. S2CID 242242900.
- Brahm, Otto (2018) [1880]. Das deutsche Ritterdrama des achtzehnten Jahrhunderts : Studien über Joseph August von Törring, seine Vorgänger und Nachfolger (in German). Berlin; Boston: De Gruyter. ISBN 978-3-11-134755-4. OCLC 1167135267.
- Bridgwater, Patrick (10 October 2013). The German Gothic Novel in Anglo-German Perspective. Amsterdam; New York: Rodopi. ISBN 978-94-012-0992-2.
- Chisholm, Hugh, ed. (1911). "Huber, Ludwig Ferdinand" . Encyclopædia Britannica. Vol. 13 (11th ed.). New York: The Encyclopædia Britannica Company. pp. 845–846.
- Dröse, Astrid; Robert, Jörg (2017). "Editoriale Aneignung und usurpierte Autorschaft. Schillers "Thalia"-Projekt". Zeitschrift für Germanistik (in German). 27 (1): 108–131. doi:10.3726/92156_108. ISSN 0323-7982. JSTOR 26583121.
- Espagne, Michel (1996). "Übersetzer in Paris und Leipzig: Michael Huber (1727-1804)". In Espagne, Michel; Greiling, Werner (eds.). Frankreichfreunde: Mittler des französisch-deutschen Kulturtransfers (1750–1850) (in German). Leipzig: Leipziger Universitätsverlag. pp. 85–106. ISBN 978-3-929031-94-2. OCLC 36819017.
- Fischer, Bernhard (2014). Johann Friedrich Cotta Verleger – Entrepreneur – Politiker (in German). Göttingen: Wallstein. ISBN 978-3-8353-2568-5. OCLC 875592649.
- Gaier, Ulrich; Lawitschka, Valérie; Metzger, Stefan; Rapp, Wolfgang; Waibel, Violetta (2002). Hölderlin Texturen 4. "Wo sind jezt Dichter?" Homburg, Stuttgart 1798-1800 (in German). Tübingen: Hölderlin-Gesellschaft. ISBN 978-3-933679-67-3. OCLC 1001131439.
- Geiger, Ludwig (1901). Therese Huber, 1764 bis 1829 (in German). Stuttgart: Cotta.
- Godet, Philippe Ernest (1906). Madame de Charrière et ses amis d'après de nombreux documents inédits (1740–1805) (in French). Vol. 2. Geneva: Jullien. OCLC 61980118.
- Goethe, Johann Wolfgang von (1848). The auto-biography of Goethe. Truth and poetry: from my own life. Translated by Oxenford, John. London: H. G. Bohn.
- Hahn, Andrea; Fischer, Bernhard (1993). "Alles ... von mir!" : Therese Huber (1764–1829) : Schriftstellerin und Redakteurin (in German). Marbach am Neckar: Deutsche Schillergesellschaft. ISBN 3-929146-05-3. OCLC 231965804.
- Hahn, Andrea (2012). "Huber, Ludwig Ferdinand". Verfasser-Datenbank: Autorinnen und Autoren der deutschsprachigen Literatur und des deutschsprachigen Raums: Von den Anfängen bis zur Gegenwart (in German). De Gruyter.
- Heuser, Magdalene (2008). "Ludwig Ferdinand Huber's contribution to the reception of Isabelle de Charrière's work in Germany". In Dijk, Suzanna van; Whatley, Janet; Genootschap Belle van Zuylen (eds.). Isabelle de Charrière face aux hommes: correspondants, épouseurs ou personnages de fiction = Belle de Zuylen facing men: correspondents, lovers or fictitious figures (PDF). Utrecht: Genootschap Belle van Zuylen, Universiteit Utrecht. pp. 40–59. OCLC 974089807. Archived (PDF) from the original on 3 May 2019.
- Huber, Ludwig Ferdinand (1796). "Ueber ein merkwürdiges Buch". Humaniora (in German). 1: 71–85.
- Huber, Therese (2020) [1999]. Bergmann-Törner, Corinna; Coleman Brandt, Diane; Harmeyer, Jutta; Heuser, Magdalene; Wulbusch, Petra (eds.). Briefe. Band 1. Tübingen: Max Niemeyer. doi:10.1515/9783110931952. ISBN 978-3-11-093195-2. OCLC 1226679082.
- Jordan, Sabine Dorothea (1978). Ludwig Ferdinand Huber (1764–1804): his life and works. Stuttgart: Akademischer Verlag Heinz. ISBN 978-3-88099058-6. OCLC 721990490.
- Kanther, Michael A.; Petzina, Dietmar (30 April 2021). Victor Aimé Huber (1800–1869) (in German). Berlin: Duncker & Humblot. ISBN 978-3-428-50122-9.
- Kleßmann, Eckart (1992). "Ich war kühn, aber nicht frevelhaft" das Leben der Caroline Schlegel-Schelling (in German). Bergisch Gladbach: Lübbe. ISBN 978-3-7857-0619-0.
- Kunze, Wilhelm Friedrich (1860). Die Mitglieder der St. Johannis-Loge Minerva zu den drei Palmen im ersten Jahrhundert (in German). Leipzig: Printed for Br. Wassermann. OCLC 315694143.
- Lemmel, Monika (1 January 2016). "Zeitschriftenedition mit Kommentar: Schillers Thalia (1785–1791)". In Jones, Lydia; Plachta, Bodo; Pailer, Gaby; Roy, Catherine Karen (eds.). Scholarly Editing and German Literature: Revision, Revaluation, Edition. Amsterdamer Beiträge zur neueren Germanistik (in German). Vol. 86. Leiden: Brill. pp. 200–212. doi:10.1163/9789004305472_012. ISBN 978-90-04-30547-2.
- Luserke-Jaqui, Matthias (18 July 2011). Schiller-Handbuch: Leben – Werk – Wirkung (in German). Stuttgart; Weimar: J. B. Metzler. ISBN 978-3-476-05283-4.
- Mandelkow, Karl Robert (1 December 1962). "Der proteische Dichter". Neophilologus (in German). 46 (1): 19–31. doi:10.1007/BF01560828. ISSN 1572-8668. S2CID 163975061.
- Paulin, Roger (2016). The Life of August Wilhelm Schlegel, Cosmopolitan of Art and Poetry (1 ed.). Cambridge: Open Book Publishers. ISBN 978-1-909254-95-4. JSTOR j.ctt19qggtt.
- Pilling, Claudia; Schilling, Diana; Springer, Mirjam (2005). Schiller. London: Haus Publishing. ISBN 978-1-904341-65-9.
- Prölß, Robert (1883). Geschichte der dramatischen Literatur und Kunst in Deutschland von der Reformation bis auf die Gegenwart (in German). Vol. 1. Leipzig: B. Schlicke.
- Riepl-Schmidt, Mascha (2016). Therese Huber (1764–1829) – "Ich will Weisheit tauschen gegen Glück": ein Leben als Bildungsroman (in German). Frankfurt: Peter Lang GmbH, Internationaler Verlag der Wissenschaften. ISBN 978-3-631-49174-4. OCLC 951975843.
- Rooksby, Emma (2005). "Moral Theory in the Fiction of Isabelle de Charrière: The Case of Three Women". Hypatia. 20 (1): 1–20. ISSN 0887-5367. JSTOR 3810841.
- Ruiz, Alain (1990). "Après la parution du traité Zum ewigen Frieden : le "sage de Königsberg" en bonnet jacobin ou la première image de Kant en France". Cahiers d'Études Germaniques (in French). 18 (1): 215–234. doi:10.3406/cetge.1990.1110. S2CID 193478959.
- Saine, Thomas P. (1972). Georg Forster. New York: Twayne Publishers. ISBN 0-8057-2316-1.
- Saine, Thomas P. (1980). "Review of Ludwig Ferdinand Huber (1764–1804). His Life and Works (Stuttgarter Arbeiten zur Germanistik, Nr. 57)". The German Quarterly. 53 (1): 119–121. doi:10.2307/405259. ISSN 0016-8831. JSTOR 405259.
- Saine, Thomas P. (1983). "Goethe's Novel, Campagne in Frankreich". In Lillyman, William J. (ed.). Goethe's Narrative Fiction: The Irvine Goethe Symposium. Berlin; New York: De Gruyter. pp. 193–223. doi:10.1515/9783110840254-013. ISBN 978-3-11-084025-4.
- Schiller, Friedrich (1892). Jonas, Fritz (ed.). Schillers Briefe (in German). Stuttgart: Deutsche Verlags-Anstalt.
- Schiller, Friedrich; Huber, Ludwig Ferdinand; Seyboth, Hermann (1900). Avanturen des neuen Telemachs; oder, Leben und Exsertionen Koerners des decenten, consequenten, piquanten [etc.] (in German). Leipzig: A.H. Payne.
- Schings, Hans-Jürgen (1996). Die Brüder des Marquis Posa : Schiller und die Geheimbund der Illuminaten (in German). Tübingen: Niemeyer. ISBN 3-484-10728-6. OCLC 34973809.
- Schlegel, Friedrich (1 January 2008). Patsch, Hermann; Eichner, Hans; Behler, Ernst (eds.). Höhepunkt und Zerfall der romantischen Schule (1799–1802). Friedrich Schlegel – Kritische Ausgabe seiner Werke (in German). Vol. 25. Paderborn: Brill/Schöningh. doi:10.30965/9783657778256. ISBN 978-3-657-77825-6.
- Segebrecht, Wulf (1972). "Huber, Ludwig Ferdinand". Neue Deutsche Biographie (in German). Vol. 9. Berlin: Duncker & Humblot. pp. 684–685. (full text online).
- Segebrecht, Wulf (1972). "Huber, Michael". Neue Deutsche Biographie (in German). Vol. 9. Berlin: Duncker & Humblot. pp. 685–686. (full text online).
- Uhlig, Ludwig (2004). Georg Forster: Lebensabenteuer eines gelehrten Weltbürgers (1754–1794) (in German). Göttingen: Vandenhoeck & Ruprecht. ISBN 978-3-525-36731-5.
- Vecchiato, Daniele (2 January 2020). "'Richter die ihr richtet im Verborgenen': Literary Representations of the Vehmic Court in the Age of Goethe". Publications of the English Goethe Society. 89 (1): 60–75. doi:10.1080/09593683.2020.1723320. ISSN 0959-3683. S2CID 216541876.
- Whatley, Janet (2008). "The engaged life of a quiet man: Charles-Emmanuel de Charrière". In Dijk, Suzanna van; Whatley, Janet; Genootschap Belle van Zuylen (eds.). Isabelle de Charrière face aux hommes: correspondants, épouseurs ou personnages de fiction = Belle de Zuylen facing men: correspondents, lovers or fictitious figures (PDF). Utrecht: Genootschap Belle van Zuylen, Universiteit Utrecht. pp. 11–23. OCLC 974089807. Archived (PDF) from the original on 3 May 2019.
- "Avanturen des neuen Telemachs oder Leben und Exsertionen Koerners des Decenten, Consequenten, Piquanten". Yale University Library.
