= Meta Forkel-Liebeskind =

German translator (1765 – c. 1853)

Sophie Margarethe "Meta" Forkel-Liebeskind
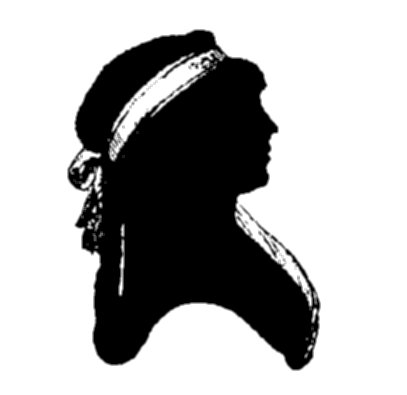
- Born: Sophie Margarethe Dorothea Wedekind; February 22, 1765; Göttingen, Electorate of Hanover, Holy Roman Empire
- Died: 1853 (unconfirmed); Eichstätt, Kingdom of Bavaria, German Confederation
- Occupations: Writer, translator
- Spouses: Johann Nikolaus Forkel (1781–1794); Johann Heinrich Liebeskind(1794–1847)
- Relatives: Sophia Magdalena Wedekind (née Morrien) (mother); Rudolph Wedekind (father); Georg von Wedekind (brother); Karl Gottlieb Forkel (son)
- Writing career
- Language: German

Meta Forkel-Liebeskind (22 February 1765 – c. 1853) was a German translator, writer, and member of the Göttingen intellectual circle. She maintained close ties to Georg Forster and embraced the Enlightenment and republican deals of the Mainz Republic.

Forkel-Liebeskind was one of the so-called Universitätsmamsellen, a group of five academically active women during the 18th and 19th century, daughters of academics at Göttingen University, alongside Philippine Engelhard, Caroline Schelling, Therese Huber, and Dorothea Schlözer.

== Life and career ==
=== Education ===
Born in Göttingen, Forkel-Liebeskind was the first daughter and second surviving child of Rudolf Wedekind, a pastor and university professor, and his wife Sophia Magdalena Wedekind (née Morrien). Her older brother was Georg von Wedekind.

She received private lectures from her father, who placed particular emphasis on her education. Forkel-Liebeskind showed an early talent for languages, and her father partly tailored her lessons to her interests. This unusual education for women of her time and the work of her father as a professor at the University of Göttingen gave her access to the intellectual circles of the Enlightenment.

=== First marriage and early writings ===
After marrying the musicologist Johann Nikolaus Forkel in 1781 and the birth to their son in 1782 Forkel-Liebeskind moved to Einbeck, the birth city of her mother. In Einbeck she began writing and published anonymously her Originalbrief einer Mutter von 18 Jahren (1783), followed by her first novel Maria (1784). After the publications she moved back to Göttingen.

Reports of an affair with the poet Gottfried August Bürger and dissatisfaction in her marriage led to her being viewed as frivolous by Göttingen society. To evade the public negative image, she moved to Berlin in1788, where she took literature lessons to refine her writing style under the guidance of the author Johann Jakob Engel, a successful translator at the time. Because of her good English and French, Forkel-Liebeskind started translating her first works from English to German, such as the first two volumes of Geschichte der Königin Elisabeth von England and Skizze der Regierung Georg III.

=== Translation work in cooperation with Georg Forster ===
In 1789 she visited her brother in Mainz with her mother and son. There she reunited with her Göttingen acquaintance Therese Forster, now married to the famous naturalist and travel writer Georg Forster, known for his travels with James Cook on his second voyage circumnavigating the globe.

Georg Forster ran a translation workshop in Mainz producing affordable German editions of English and French texts. From 1789 until 1792 Forkel-Liebeskind worked as a translator for him especially on historical works and travel literature. While Forkel-Liebeskind was translating the texts, Forster would supervise the work, revise it, add a preface and publish it under his name. Forkel-Liebeskind became one of Forster's favorite collaborators as she was working quick although sometimes inaccurate. The two developed a close friendship, and she shared Forster’s republican sympathies. Her descriptions also indicate that they worked as a team to provide new material for the literary marketplace.

In the years before the Mainz Revolution the house of the Forsters had become a meeting place for intellectuals from all over Germany with visitors like Johann Wolfgang von Goethe, Alexander von Humboldt, Wilhelm von Humboldt, Ludwig Ferdinand Huber, and Caroline Schelling. It has been suggested that Forkel-Liebeskind viewed the revolutionary developments in Mainz favorably and supported Forster, a central figure in the Mainz Republic, in his political engagement.

=== Independent work during second pregnancy ===
Forkel-Liebeskind returned to Göttingen to organise her financial circumstances as her salary for the translations were mostly send to her husband in Göttingen. While still being married, she began a relationship with the musician and law student Johann Heinrich Liebeskind, with whom she later had a child. Her pregnancy meant the exclusion from the society in Göttingen for her. Therefore she moved to Bamberg. During her pregnancy Forkel-Liebeskind developed a more independent identity as a translator and worked less with Forster. Instead, she translated mainly gothic and sentimental novels from authors like Horace Walpole and Ann Radcliffe.

After her son (Adalbert) was born (2 October 1792) Forkel-Liebeskind moved back to Mainz (19 October 1792) to live with Caroline Michaelis-Böhmer. During the Siege of Mainz (1793) by the Prussian and Austrian armies Forkel-Liebeskind attempted to flee but got caught and imprisoned at Königstein Fortress. According to Liebeskind, the women were kept in prison because they were meant to serve as hostages in a planned exchange for the Mainz citizens who had been taken to France by the French authorities. After approximately four months of imprisonment, she was released through the intervention of her husband, Johann Nikolaus Forkel and the Frederick William II of Prussia.

=== Later years and second marriage ===
Johann Heinrich Liebeskind accompanied Forkel-Liebeskind to Göttingen before they traveled over Lübeck to Riga where Liebeskind started his career as a high-ranking jurist and civil servant in the Prussian and later Bavarian judicial administration. She was divorced from Johann Nikolaus Forkel on 11 February 1794 and married Johann Heinrich Liebeskind in August of the same year. After their time in Riga they moved together to Königsberg (August 1794), Ansbach (September 1797), Bamberg (April 1807), Munich (Dezember 1807), Landshut (April 1827) and Eichstätt (1838).

During her second marriage, Forkel-Liebeskind largely remained in the traditional role of an official’s wife. The only known exception was her work for Johann Friedrich Cotta’s cultural journal Morgenblatt für gebildete Stände between 1812 and 1821, where she headed the section “Korrespondenznachrichten für München” (“Correspondence News from Munich”).

In 1837 Forkel-Liebeskind started having serious health problems, after which no further records of her life are known. Although some sources claim that she died in Eichstätt in 1853 this but cannot be confirmed by sources and both the date and place are considered incorrect.
