= Volker Bengl =

German tenor

Volker Bengl (born 18 July 1960) is a German tenor, born in Ludwigshafen, Rhineland.

He studied singing at the Hochschule für Musik in Mannheim and Heidelberg and took private lessons with Rudolf Schock, Rina del Monaco, and Erika Köth. He was engaged by the Staatstheater am Gärtnerplatz in Munich, where his career continued for 16 years. In addition, he has appeared in over 50 German-language theaters, such as the Vienna Volksoper, the Deutsche Oper Berlin, and the Dresden Semperoper. His repertoire includes some 75 operas and operettas, and he has given 800 concerts worldwide.

== Discography ==
- Vorhang auf – Volker Bengl 1998 (Koch Records)
- Schön ist die Welt 2001 (Koch Records)
- Leb' deine Träume 2002 (Koch Records)
- Magische Töne 2003 (Koch Universal Music GmbH, UNI865571)
- Jeder Weg hat ein Ziel 2008 (Koch - Universal)

== Sources ==
- Augsburger Allgemeine, "Interview: Schubert für den Bauch", 21 July 2008
- Cummings, David (ed.), "Bengl, Volker", International Who's Who in Classical Music 2003, Routledge, 2003, p. 61. ISBN 1-85743-174-X
- Das Erste, Volker Bengl: Ein Film von Constantin Pauli, 23 August 2002
