= Otto Philipp Braun (journalist) =

German newspaper editor (1824–1900)

Otto Philipp Braun (1 August 1824 – 10 June 1900) was a German newspaper editor and translator. He was the nephew of the Bolivian general of the same name.

He was born in Kassel where he attended the Lyceum Fridericianum, and later studied law, history, and modern languages in Bonn, Heidelberg and Marburg. He was the president of the Marburg Students' Society and participated in the student parliaments at Eisenach. During the 1850s he lived and worked in Paris, Madrid, Kassel and Munich, in 1855 joining the staff of the pro-Prussian Allgemeine Zeitung in Augsburg (and later in Munich). He became the chief editor in March 1869, and continued with the paper until 1891.

Active in the literary life of Munich and a friend of Paul Heyse, he is remembered for his translations from the Spanish and as the editor of the Cottaschen Musenalmenach.

== Bibliography ==
- H. Brendicke: "Das Dr. O. Braun'sche Buecherzeichen" in Ex libris: Buchkunst und angewandte Graphik, Volume 6, ed. Wolfgang Mecklenburg. C. A. Starke, Goerlitz, 1896. Pages 16–17.
- Wilhelm Kosch. Deutsches Literatur-Lexikon.
