= Philippine Engelhard =

German poet (1756–1831)

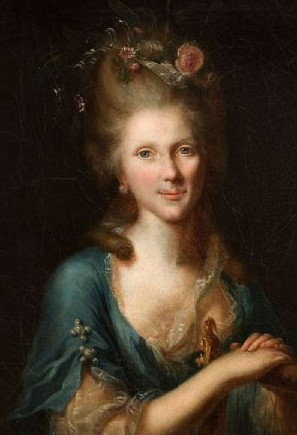
Johann Heinrich Tischbein - Philippine Engelhard

Philippine Engelhard (21 October 1756 – 28 September 1831), was a German poet. She was one of the so-called Universitätsmamsellen, a group of five academically active women during the 18th-and 19th century, daughters of academics on Göttingen University, alongside Meta Forkel-Liebeskind, Caroline Schelling, Therese Huber, and Dorothea Schlözer.

== Sources ==
- Eckart Kleßmann: Universitätsmamsellen. Fünf aufgeklärte Frauen zwischen Rokoko, Revolution und Romantik. Die Andere Bibliothek Bd. 281. Eichborn, Frankfurt am Main 2008, ISBN 978-3-8218-4588-3
