= Johann Friedrich Cotta (theologian) =

German Lutheran theologian (1701–1779)

Johann Friedrich Cotta (12 March 1701, Tübingen – 31 December 1779, Tübingen) was a German Lutheran theologian.

== Biography ==
He was the son of Johann Georg Cotta II, who was in turn the son of Johann Georg Cotta I, the founder of the publishing J. G. Cotta publishing house. After studying theology at the University of Tübingen, Johann Friedrich began his academic career as lecturer at the University of Jena. He then traveled through Germany, France and the Netherlands, and, after spending several years in London, became professor at Tübingen in 1733.

In 1736, he moved to the University of Göttingen to take up the chair of theology. Two years prior, George II of Great Britain, in his role as elector of Hanover, had founded the University of Göttingen. However, in 1739, Cotta returned, as extraordinary professor of theology, to his alma mater, Tübingen, and, after successively filling the chairs of history, poetry and oratory, was appointed ordinary professor of theology there in 1741.

He died while serving as the chancellor of Tübingen. His scholarship was at once wide and accurate; his theological views were orthodox, although he did not believe in strict verbal inspiration.

== Works ==
He was a voluminous writer. His major works include:

- Johann Gerhard, Loci Theologici, as editor (1762–1777)
- Kirchenhistorie des Neuen Testaments, as author (1768–1773)

== Family ==
His grandnephew was the publisher of the same name, Johann Friedrich Cotta, dedicating the press to publishing notable German authors such as Johann von Goethe and Friedrich Schiller.
