= Allgemeine Zeitung =

Political daily journal in Germany

The Allgemeine Zeitung was the leading political daily journal in Germany in the first part of the 19th century. It has been widely recognised as the first world-class German journal and a symbol of the German press abroad.

The Allgemeine Zeitung (lit. 'general newspaper') was founded in 1798 by Johann Friedrich Cotta in Tübingen. The works of Schiller and Goethe were published on its pages.

After 1803, the journal was published in Stuttgart. From 1807 to 1882, it was published in Augsburg.

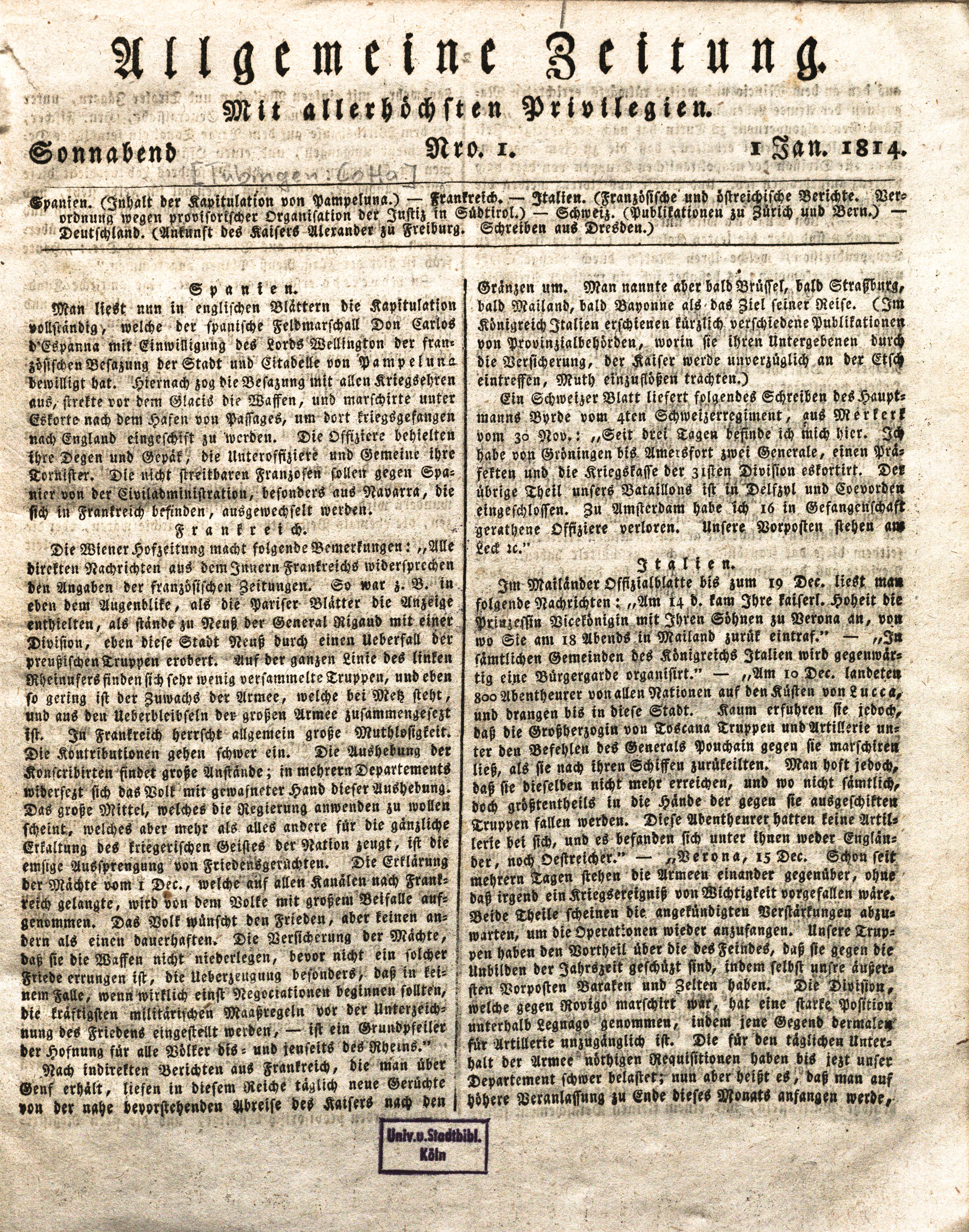
Allgemeine Zeitung on 1 January 1814 (front page)

Heinrich Heine was a major contributor to the journal. From 1831 he wrote reports on music and painting and became the newspaper's Parisian correspondent. He wrote articles on the French way of life but also about Louis-Philippe and German politics.

In 1882, the Allgemeine Zeitung moved to Munich. The journal stopped publishing on 29 July 1929.

The tradition of this major journal is still maintained by the Augsburger Allgemeine Zeitung, Frankfurter Allgemeine Zeitung and the Allgemeine Zeitung edited in Mainz.

== Editors-in-chief ==
- Ernst Ludwig Posselt (1798)
- Ludwig Ferdinand Huber (9 September 1798 to 1804)
- Karl Joseph Stegmann (1804–1837)
- Gustav Kolb (1828–1865)
- Otto Philipp Braun (journalist) (1869–1889)

Writers for the Allgemeine Zeitung were Ludwig Börne, Carl Ludwig Fernow, Karl Gutzkow, Ferdinand Gregorovius, Friedrich Hebbel, Heinrich Heine, Jakob Philipp Fallmerayer, Friedrich List, Alfred von Reumont, August Schleicher, Friedrich Johann Lorenz Meyer, Fritz Anneke and Mathilde Franziska Anneke and many more.
