= Victor Aimé Huber =

German writer

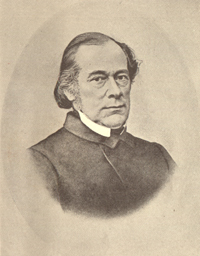
Victor Huber

Victor Aimé Huber (10 March 1800 – 19 July 1869) was a German social reformer, travel writer and a literature historian.

Huber was born in Stuttgart, Germany. His parents, Ludwig Ferdinand and Therese Huber, née Heyne, were both writers. After the early death of his father, Victor was sent to live with friends of his parents in Hofwil, Switzerland. Victor was just six years old at the time.

Huber graduated in medicine in 1820 and afterwards undertook several travels to France, Portugal, England, Spain and Italy. In 1828, Huber accepted a post as a teacher of history and modern languages at a gymnasium in Bremen, Germany. In 1832, he became a professor of modern and oriental languages in Rostock, in 1836 in Marburg and in 1843 professor for the history of literature in Berlin.

Huber took part in the establishment of a conservative party in Prussia, from which he, however, withdrew after a short time because of the interests of feudal landlords. His real aim was to help the reintegration of workers into civil society, and for this reason, he gave up his professorship in Berlin in order to dedicate himself to the social questions of the day.

Soon afterwards, Huber was able to propose a new social model to improve the life conditions of low-wage workers after visiting Manchester, in England, in 1844, where he acquainted himself with the housing and living conditions of factory workers. He named this model "internal occupation" (innere Ansiedlung).

Huber was one of the intellectual predecessors of the cooperative movement in Germany. He carried out his socio-political concepts in practice. From 1849 to 1852, Huber was active in the executive committee of the not-for-profit building firm of the 'Citizens of Berlin', which built six small houses for 15 families on a property at Schoenhauser Av. What was to become a showcase for his "internal occupation" model, however, had a short duration. In 1888/1889, the houses were demolished to make space for larger and denser buildings.

Huber died, aged 69, in Wernigerode.

== Works ==
- De lingua et osse hyoi deo pici viridis, Dissertation Stuttgart 1821
- Die Selbsthilfe der arbeitenden Klasse durch Wirtschaftsvereine und innere Ansiedlung, 1848 (anonym)
- Concordia. Bll. d. Berl. gemeinn. Baugesellschaft, Berlin 1849
- Reisebriefe aus Belgien, Frankreich und England im Sommer 1854, 1855

== Bibliography ==
- Ingwer Paulsen: Viktor Aimé Huber als Sozialpolitiker. Berlin: Herbert Renner, 1956. (Friedewalder Beiträge zur Sozialen Frage, Bd. 7)
- Michael Alfred Kanther: Victor Aimé Huber: Sozialreformer und Wegbereiter der sozialen Wohnungswirtschaft. Berlin 2000.
