= Augsburger Allgemeine =

German regional daily newspaper

Augsburger Allgemeine Zeitung

- 17 September 2010 front page
- Type: Daily newspaper
- Format: Rheinisch
- Owner: Mediengruppe Pressedruck
- Founded: 30 October 1945; 80 years ago
- Headquarters: Augsburg, Germany
- Website: www.augsburger-allgemeine.de

The Augsburger Allgemeine Zeitung is a major German regional daily newspaper published since 1945.

== History ==
From 1807 to 1882, another paper named Allgemeine Zeitung was published in Augsburg but it is not connected to the later newspaper.

Between 1933 and 1945, newspapers in Augsburg, as in the whole of Germany, were tightly controlled by the Nazi regime. With the fall of Nazi Germany, it became possible to publish anti-Nazi papers. However, in the early years the reviving free press had to contend with many restrictions placed by the Allied (specifically, American) Occupation authorities.

The newspaper was first published on 30 October 1945 under the name of Schwäbische Landeszeitung, under the initiative of Curt Frenzel. Originally, due to the restrictions in early post-war Germany, it was only published twice-weekly. Frenzel had received a licence to publish a newspaper from Colonel Bernhard MacMahon of the US military government in Bavaria.

After Curt Frenzel's death in 1970, his daughter Ellinor Holland continued the newspaper that was renamed to Augsburger Allgemeine on 1 November 1959. The newspaper and publishing company are still fully owned by the Holland family and now managed by the third generation. The paper is published in Rheinisch format.

In 2001 the paper had a circulation of 367,000 copies. Its circulation was 349,199 copies during the first quarter of 2006. In the second quarter of 2008, the newspaper sold 344,537 copies.

== Website ==
The Augsburger Allgemeine ran an automated web presence from 1997 until 2001, when an all-new website maintained by dedicated editors was introduced. As of November 2014 the staff responsible for the newspaper's web presence consists of six permanently employed editors and one search engine optimizer. They are supported by trainees who spent about two months as part of the web team during their cross-media training at the newspaper, as well as interns and freelancers.

The editorial staff researches, writes and publishes news, op-eds, multimedia content like pictures and online videos, as well as interactive services like polls, liveblogs and quizzes. One big part of the web coverage are local and regional news. For that reason the web editors work closely together with the 16 local newsrooms of the Augsburger Allgemeine. These newsrooms provide the newspaper's website with local news and cross-media content over the course of the day. Content that was originally created for the newspaper gets edited by the online staff to fit the site before it goes live.

Other parts of the Augsburger Allgemeine's web presence are an internet forum with about 30.000 registered users (November 2014), reader and editor blogs, a Facebook page with about 50.000 likes, a Twitter feed with 8500 followers as well as a Youtube channel and a Google+ account, all managed by the online editorial staff. In addition to that all of the 16 local newsrooms have their own Facebook page.

In February 2011 the newspaper's website got a technical, functional and graphical relaunch. Since then the site is run with the online CMS Escenic.

Since December 2013 the access to some of the content is subject to a charge. The Augsburger Allgemeine uses the so-called metered model for its paywall. Unregistered users have access to 10 articles per month for free, after a free registration up to 20. If a user wants to gain access to more than that, a subscription is needed.

The newspaper's website is ranked 19th on a list of Germany's top 25 news websites that gets published monthly by the AGOF. According to this list augsburger-allgemeine.de has reached 1.55 million unique users in August 2014.

== Local newspapers ==
The Augsburger Allgemeine is part of a network of local newspapers in Swabia and parts of Upper Bavaria, these being:

- Aichacher Nachrichten
- Donau-Zeitung
- Donauwörther Zeitung
- Friedberger Allgemeine
- Günzburger Zeitung
- Illertisser Zeitung
- Mittelschwäbische Nachrichten
- Landsberger Tagblatt
- Mindelheimer Zeitung
- Neuburger Rundschau
- Neu-Ulmer Zeitung
- Rieser Nachrichten
- Schwabmünchner Allgemeine
- Wertinger Zeitung
