= Christian Ludwig von Hagedorn =

German art historian and collector, amateur engraver and diplomat

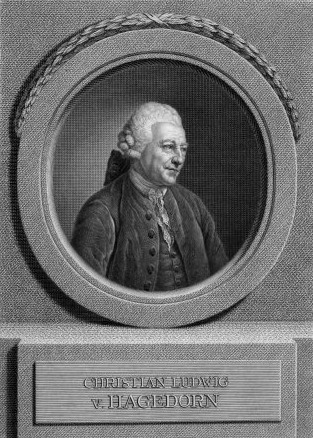
Christian Ludwig von Hagedorn; by Johann Friedrich Bause

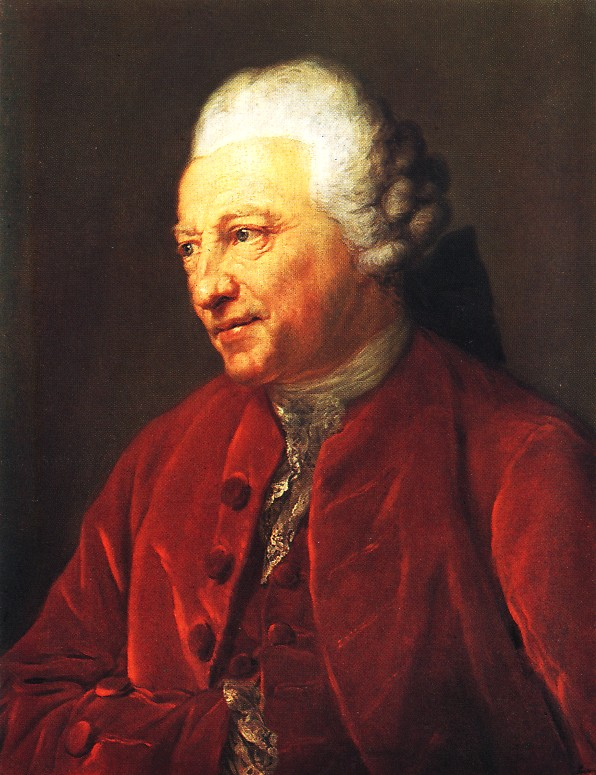
Portrait by Anton Graff (1772)

Christian Ludwig von Hagedorn (14 February 1712, Hamburg – 24 January 1780, Dresden) was a German art historian and collector, as well as an amateur engraver. He also served as a diplomat. His elder brother, Friedrich, was a well known poet.

== Biography ==
His father, Hans Statius von Hagedorn, was a diplomat in the service of Denmark. He studied law at the University of Altdorf, but his letters indicate he was already interested in art. He transferred to the University of Jena in 1732. Five years later, he entered the diplomatic service as a legation secretary, and advanced to legation counselor. As he was posted to various German courts, he visited the local art collections and acquired a reputation as a connoisseur. During these trips, he met various art historians and critics, such as Johann Joachim Winckelmann, Johann Georg Sulzer and Salomon Gessner, with whom he maintained a correspondence. Over his fifteen years of service, he also built up a substantial art collection.

After leaving the diplomatic corps, in 1752, he began to establish himself as an art critic and, in 1755, published an anonymous catalogue of his collection, including critical comments and a history of German art. This was intended to be a sort of continuation of the Teutsche Academie, a dictionary by Joachim von Sandrart. He wasn't able to generate interest in his collection, but received an offer from the bookseller, Christoph Friedrich Nicolai, to work on the recently created Library of the Fine Sciences and the Free Arts

In 1762, he published Observations on Painting under his own name. It was based on French and English theories, as well as his own research, and emphasized feeling over reason as a criterion for judging art. He was among the first to place Northern European art on a par with the Italians. A year later, he was commissioned to develop a concept for a Saxon academy and drawing school; seeking advice from Johann Georg Wille, a famous German engraver resident in Paris. In 1764, he became the first General Director of the new Dresden Academy of Fine Arts; a position he would hold until his death. He was elected a member of the Göttingen Academy of Sciences and Humanities in 1766.
