= Johann Friedrich Cotta (publisher) =

German publisher, industrial pioneer and politician (1764–1832)

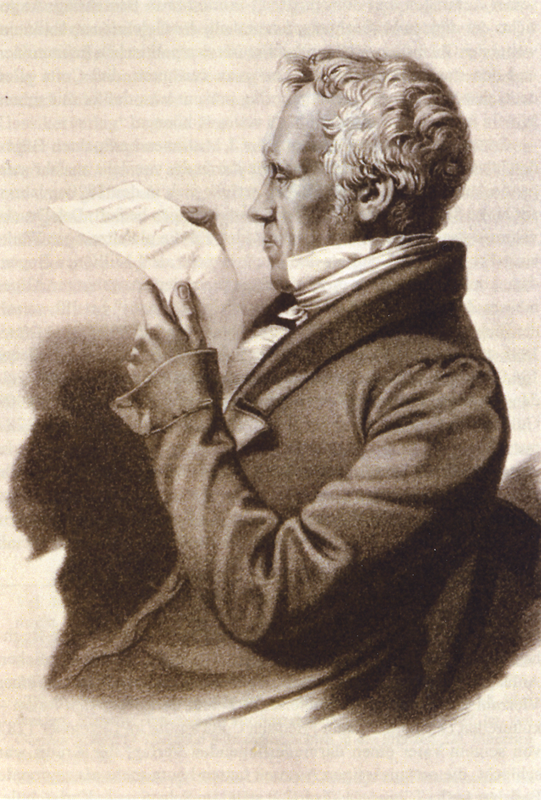
Johann Friedrich Freiherr von Cotta

Johann Friedrich, Freiherr Cotta von Cottendorf (27 April 1764 – 29 December 1832) was a German publisher, industrial pioneer and politician.

== Ancestors ==
Cotta is the name of a family of German publishers, intimately connected with the history of German literature. The Cottas were of noble Italian descent, and at the time of the Reformation the family was settled in Eisenach in Thuringia.

Johann Georg Cotta (1631–1692), the founder of the publishing house of J. G. Cotta, married in 1659 the widow of the university bookseller, Philipp Braun, in Tübingen, and took over the management of his business, thus establishing the firm which was subsequently associated with Cotta's name. On his death, in 1692, the undertaking passed to his only son, also named Johann Georg; and on his death in 1712, to the latter's eldest son, also named Johann Georg, while the second son, Johann Friedrich, became a distinguished theologian.

Although the eldest son of the third Johann Georg, Christoph Friedrich Cotta (1730–1807), established a printing-house to the court at Stuttgart, the business languished.

== Life ==
It was reserved to the youngest son of Christoph Friedrich, Johann Friedrich, to restore the fortunes of the firm. Born in Stuttgart, Johann Friedrich Cotta attended the gymnasium of his native place, and was originally intended to study theology. He, however, entered the University of Tübingen as a student of mathematics and law, and after graduating spent a considerable time in Paris, studying French and natural science, and mixing with distinguished literary men. After practising as an advocate in one of the higher courts, Cotta, in compliance with his father's earnest desire, took over the publishing business at Tübingen. He began in December 1787, and laboured incessantly to acquire familiarity with all the details. From 1793 to 1794, Orell Füssli in Zürich published Marianne Ehrmann's Die Einsiedlerinn aus den Alpen, the first magazine that was published by a woman in Switzerland; her early death stopped the further issues. Because the self-publishing could not handle the success of her former magazine, Marianne and her husband agreed on a takeover by Cotta, but in 1793 occurred irreconcilable conflicts; Cotta founded the journal Flora with the subscriber base, and Marianne Ehrmann continued the magazine Einsiedlerinn aus den Alpen. The house connexions rapidly extended; and, in 1794, the Allgemeine Zeitung, of which Schiller was to be editor, was planned. Schiller was compelled to withdraw on account of his health; but his friendship with Cotta deepened every year, and was a great advantage to the poet and his family. Cotta awakened in Schiller so warm an attachment that, as Heinrich Döring tells us in his life of Schiller (1824), when a bookseller offered him a higher price than Cotta for the copyright of Wallenstein, the poet firmly declined it, replying "Cotta deals honestly with me, and I with him." In 1795 Schiller and Cotta founded the Horen, a periodical very important to the student of German literature. The poet intended, by means of this work, to infuse higher ideas into the common lives of men, by giving them a nobler human culture, and "to reunite the divided political world under the banner of truth and beauty." The Horen brought Goethe and Schiller into intimate relations with each other and with Cotta; and Goethe, while regretting that he had already promised Wilhelm Meister to another publisher, contributed the Unterhaltung deutscher Ausgewanderten, the Roman Elegies and a paper on Literary Sansculottism. Fichte sent essays from the first, and the other brilliant German authors of the time were also represented. In 1798 the Allgemeine Zeitung appeared at Tübingen, being edited first by Posselt and then by Huber. Soon the editorial office of the newspaper was transferred to Stuttgart, in 1803 to Ulm, and in 1810 to Augsburg; it is now in Munich.

In 1799 Cotta entered on his political career, being sent to Paris by the Württemberg estates as their representative. Here he made friendships which proved very advantageous for the Allgemeine Zeitung. In 1801 he paid another visit to Paris, also in a political capacity, when he carefully studied Napoleon's policy, and treasured up many hints which were useful to him in his literary undertakings.

He still, however, devoted most of his attention to his own business, and, for many years, made all the entries into the ledger with his own hand. He relieved the tedium of almost ceaseless toil by pleasant intercourse with literary men. With Schiller, Huber, and Gottlieb Konrad Pfeffel (1736–1809) he was on terms of the warmest friendship; and he was also intimate with Herder, Schelling, Fichte, Richter, Voss, Hebel, Tieck, Therese Huber, Matthisson, the brothers Wilhelm and Alexander von Humboldt, Johann Müller, Spittler and others, whose works he published in whole or in part. In the correspondence of A. von Humboldt with Varnhagen von Ense we see the familiar relations in which the former stood to the Cotta family. In 1795 he published the Politischen Annalen and the Jahrbücher der Baukunde, and in 1798 the Damenalmanach, along with some works of less importance. In 1807 he issued the Morgenblatt, to which Schorn's Kunstblatt and Menzel's Literaturblatt were afterwards added.

In 1810 he removed to Stuttgart; and from that time till his death he was loaded with honours. State affairs and an honourable commission from the German booksellers took him to the Vienna congress; and in 1815 he was deputy-elect at the Württemberg diet. In 1819 he became representative of the nobility; then he succeeded to the offices of member of committee and (1824) vice-president of the Württemberg second chamber. He was also appointed Prussian Geheimrat, and knight of the order of the Württemberg crown; King William I. of Württemberg having already revived the ancient nobility in his family by granting him the patent of Freiherr (Baron) Cotta von Cottendorf . Meanwhile, such publications as the Polytechnische Journal, the Hesperus, the Württembergische Jahrbücher, the Hertha, the Ausland, and the Inland issued from the press. In 1828–1829 appeared the famous correspondence between Schiller and Goethe. Cotta was an unfailing friend of young struggling men of talent.

In addition to his high standing as a publisher, he was a man of great practical energy, which flowed into various fields of activity. He was a scientific agriculturist, and promoted many reforms in farming. He was the first Württemberg landholder to abolish serfdom on his estates. In politics he was throughout his life a moderate liberal. In 1824 he set up a steam printing press in Augsburg, and, about the same time, founded a literary institute at Munich. In 1825 he started steamboats, for the first time, on Lake Constance, and introduced them in the following year on the Rhine. In 1828 he was sent to Berlin, on an important commission, by Bavaria and Württemberg, and was there rewarded with orders of distinction at the hands of the three kings. He died on 29 December 1832 in Stuttgart, leaving a son and a daughter as coheirs.

== Successors ==
His son, Johann Georg, Freiherr Cotta von Cottendorf (1796–1863), succeeded to the management of the business on the death of his father, and was materially assisted by his sister's husband, Freiherr Hermann von Reischach. He greatly extended the connections of the firm by the purchase, in 1839, of the publishing business of G. J. Göschen in Leipzig, and in 1845 of that of Vogel in Landshut; while, in 1845, "Bible" branches were established at Stuttgart and Munich. He was succeeded by his younger son, Karl, and by his nephew (the son of his sister), Hermann Albert von Reischach. Under their joint partnership, the before-mentioned firms in Leipzig and Landshut, and an artistic establishment in Munich passed into other hands, leaving on the death of Hermann Albert von Reischach, in 1876, Karl von Cotta the sole representative of the firm, until his death in 1888. In 1889 the firm of J. G. Cotta passed by purchase into the hands of Adolf and Paul Kroner, who took others into partnership. In 1899 the business was converted into a limited liability company.

Cotta's publishing company survives today, although no longer owned by the family, under the name Klett-Cotta. Its contemporary offerings include German-to-Elvish dictionaries tied into the Lord of the Rings movies.

== Sources ==
- Albert Schäffle, Cotta (1895)
- Verlags-Katalog der J. G. Cotta'schen Buchhandlung, Nachfolger (1900)
- Lord Goschen, Life and Times of G. J. Göschen (1903).
