= Therese Huber =

German author (1764–1829)

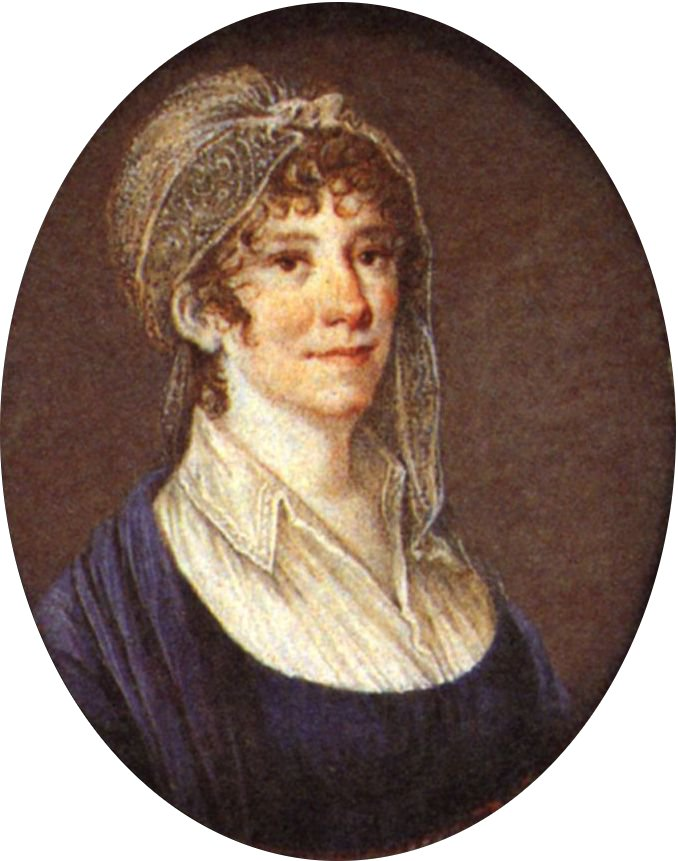
Therese Huber on a miniature by Johannes Schreiber, 1804

Therese Huber (7 May 1764 – 15 June 1829) was a German writer. She was one of the so-called Universitätsmamsellen, a group of five academically active women during the mid-18th and early 19th centuries. The group consisted of daughters of academics at Göttingen University; Huber was noteworthy among them, alongside Meta Forkel-Liebeskind, Caroline Schelling, Philippine Engelhard, and Dorothea Schlözer.

== Life ==
Therese Huber was born Marie Therese Heyne in Göttingen as daughter of the influential classical philologist Christian Gottlob Heyne and his first wife Therese (1730–1775), the daughter of lutenist and composer Sylvius Leopold Weiss.

She married the traveller and ethnologist Georg Forster in 1785. They lived in Wilno 1785–1787 and in Göttingen and Mainz 1788–1792 and had three children, but an unhappy marriage. After Forster had left Mainz for Paris as representative of the Mainz Republic, she and her lover Ludwig Ferdinand Huber, who had been living with the Forsters in Mainz, moved to Neuchâtel, living under difficult conditions there. She and Forster met for the last time in 1793, when he agreed to a divorce. However, Forster died soon after, and she married her lover. After his 1804 death, she moved in with her daughter in Ulm. Huber died in 1829 in Augsburg. The most notable of her ten children, four of whom survived to adulthood, was social reformer Victor Aimé Huber. She had a long and regular correspondence with her unmarried daughter Therese Forster, who edited Georg Forster's complete works in 1843.

== Works ==
Huber's main work consists of novels, novellas, and travel reports, at first published under her husband Ludwig's name. However, she was also working as an editor of the Morgenblatt für gebildete Stände (Morning paper for the educated classes), as translator, and as essayist. Furthermore, she wrote over 4500 letters to many important contemporaries, about a wide range of topics. Later in her life, Huber edited the works and letters of both of her husbands. Her novel, Abentheuer auf einer Reise nach Neu-Holland (Adventures on a Voyage to New Holland) was serialized in the 1793-1794 issues of the German women's magazine, Flora: part of the tale was set in Norfolk Island, which thus made its first appearance in a work of fiction. Georg Forster had been one of the party of the first Europeans ever to set foot on Norfolk Island when it was discovered in October 1774 during James Cook's second voyage, and Therese had drawn on his description of it in his Reise um die Welt.

== Publications ==
(in German) Therese Huber's published works as cited by An Encyclopedia of Continental Women Writers.

- Emilie von Varmont. Eine Geschichte in Briefen, 1794.
- Der Trostlose, comedy, 1794. (Translation of book of Isabelle de Charrière)
- Drei Weiber, 1795. (Translation of book of Isabelle de Charrière)
- Adele von Senange, 1795.
- Die Familie Seeldorf. Eine Geschichte, 1795.
- Luise. Ein Beitrag zur Geschichte der Konvenienz, 1796.
- Erzählungen 3 volumes, 1801–1802.
- Bemerkungen über Holland, 1811.
- Hannah, der Herrenhuterin Deborah Findling, 1821.
- Jugendmuth, 1824.
- Ellen Percy, oder Erziehungdurch Schicksale, 1827.
- Die Ehelosen, 1829.
- Erzählungen 6 volumes, 1830–1833.
- Die Weihe der Jungfrau bei dem Eintritt in die größere Welt, 1831.
- Die Geschichte des Cevennenn-Kriegs, 1834.

Other publications

- Abentheuer auf einer Reise nach Neu-Holland. "Teutschlands Töchtern geweiht", Tübingen 1793; English translation by Rodney Livingstone, Adventures on a Journey to New Holland, edited by Leslie Bodi, Melbourne 1966.
- L. F. Hubers sämtliche Werke seit dem Jahr 1802, nebst seiner Biographie. Bd. 1–2. Tübingen 1806–10, +Fortsetzungen 1819.
- Johann Georg Forsters Briefwechsel. Nebst einigen Nachrichten von seinem Leben (2 Bände), Leipzig 1829.
