= Christoph Ludwig Agricola =

German landscape painter (1667–1719)

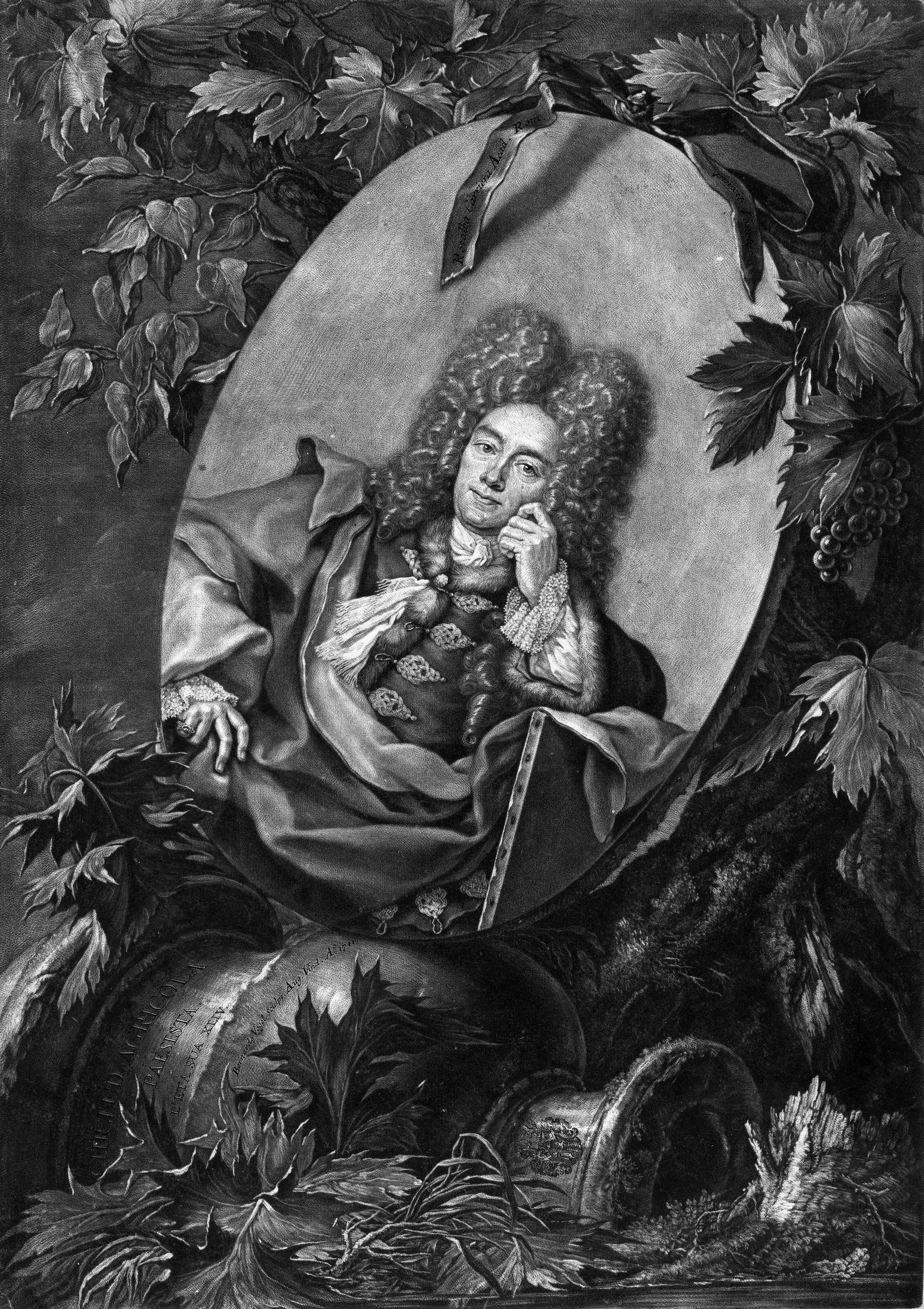
- Portrait engraving by Bernhard Vogel
- Born: 5 November 1665; Free Imperial City of Regensburg, Holy Roman Empire
- Died: 8 August 1724 (aged 58); Free Imperial City of Regensburg, Holy Roman Empire
- Known for: Painting, etching

Christoph Ludwig Agricola (5 November 1665 – 8 August 1724) was a German landscape painter and etcher. He was born and died in Regensburg (Ratisbon).

== Life and career ==
Christoph Ludwig Agricola was born on 5 November 1665 in Regensburg in Germany. He trained, as many painters of the period did, by studying nature.

He spent a great part of his life in travel visiting England, the Netherlands and France, and residing for a considerable period in Naples, where he may have been influenced by Nicolas Poussin. He also stayed in Venice for several years around 1712, where he painted many works for Zaccaria Sagredo.

He died in Regensburg in 1724.

== Work ==
Although he primarily worked in gouache and oils, documentary sources show that he also produced a small number of etchings. He was a good draughtsman, used warm lighting and exhibited a warm, masterly brushstroke.

His numerous landscapes, chiefly cabinet pictures, are remarkable for their fidelity to nature, and especially for their skilful representation of varied phases of climate, especially nocturnal scenes and weather phenomena like thunderstorms. In composition, his style shows the influence of Nicolas Poussin: Agricola's work often displays idealistic scenes like Poussin's work. In light and colour Agricola's work resembles that of Claude Lorrain. His compositions often include ruins of ancient buildings in the foreground, but his favourite foreground figures were men dressed in Oriental attire. He also produced a series of etchings of birds.

His pictures can be found in Dresden, Braunschweig, Vienna, Florence, Naples and many other locations in Germany and Italy.

== Legacy ==
He probably tutored the artist Johann Theile and had a strong influence on him. Art historians have also noted that the work of the landscape painter Christian Johann Bendeler (1699–1728) was influenced by Agricola.

== Gallery ==
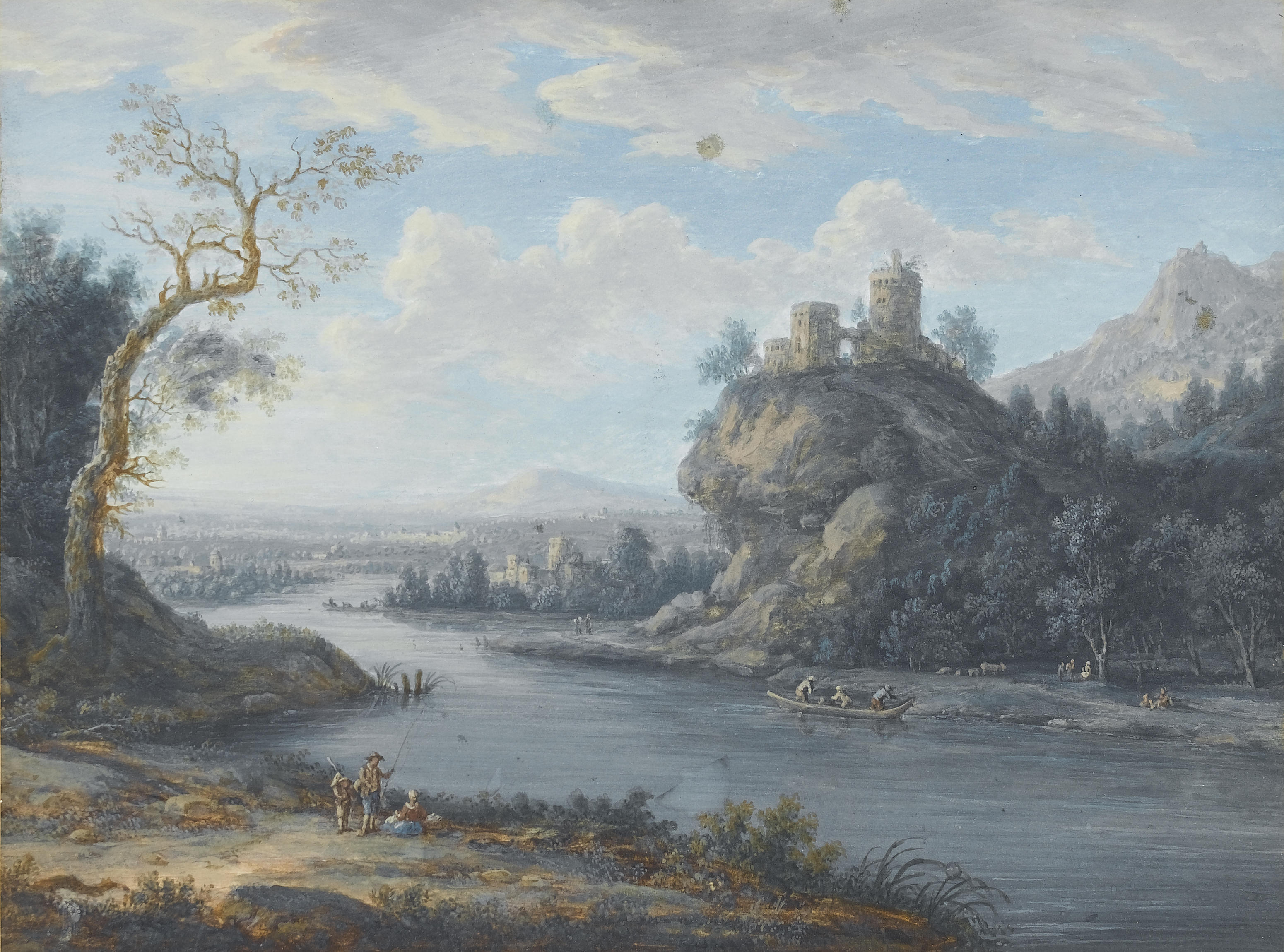
River landscape

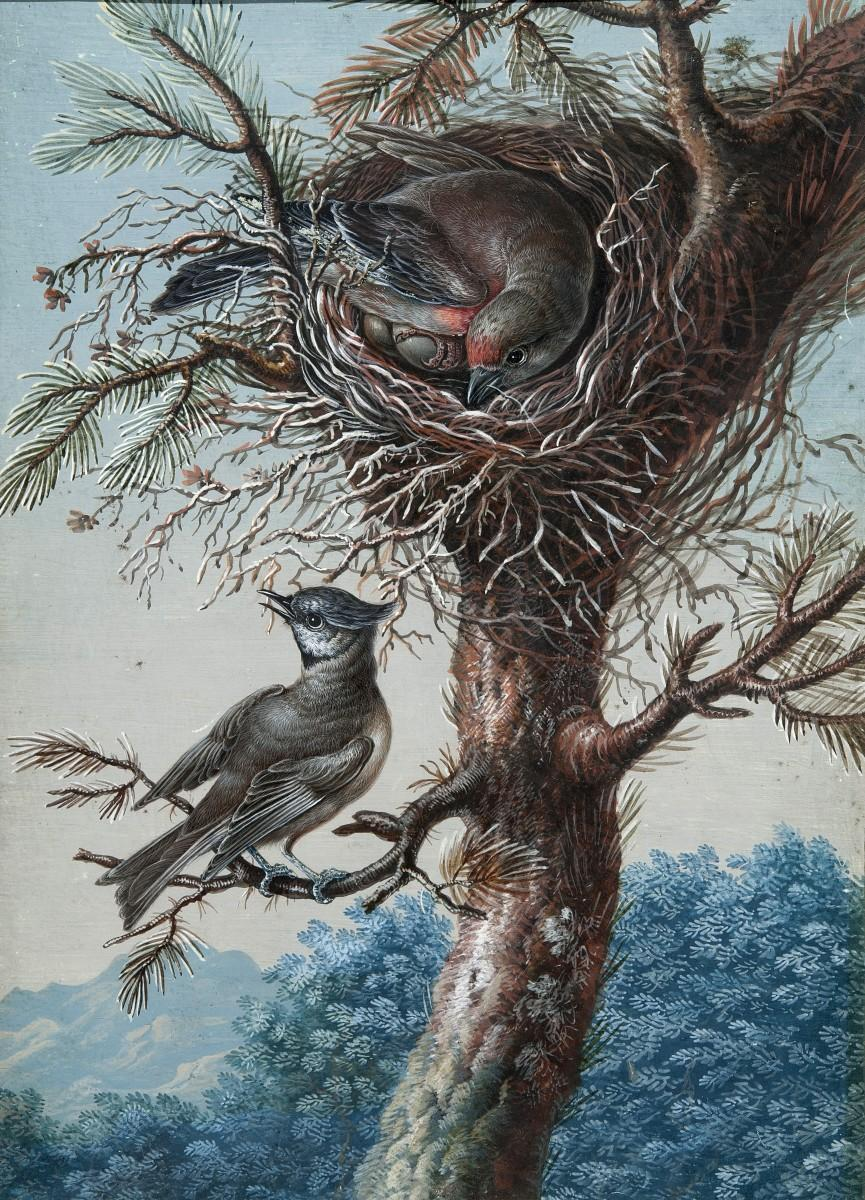
Greater Redpole and crested titmous; Bluethroat

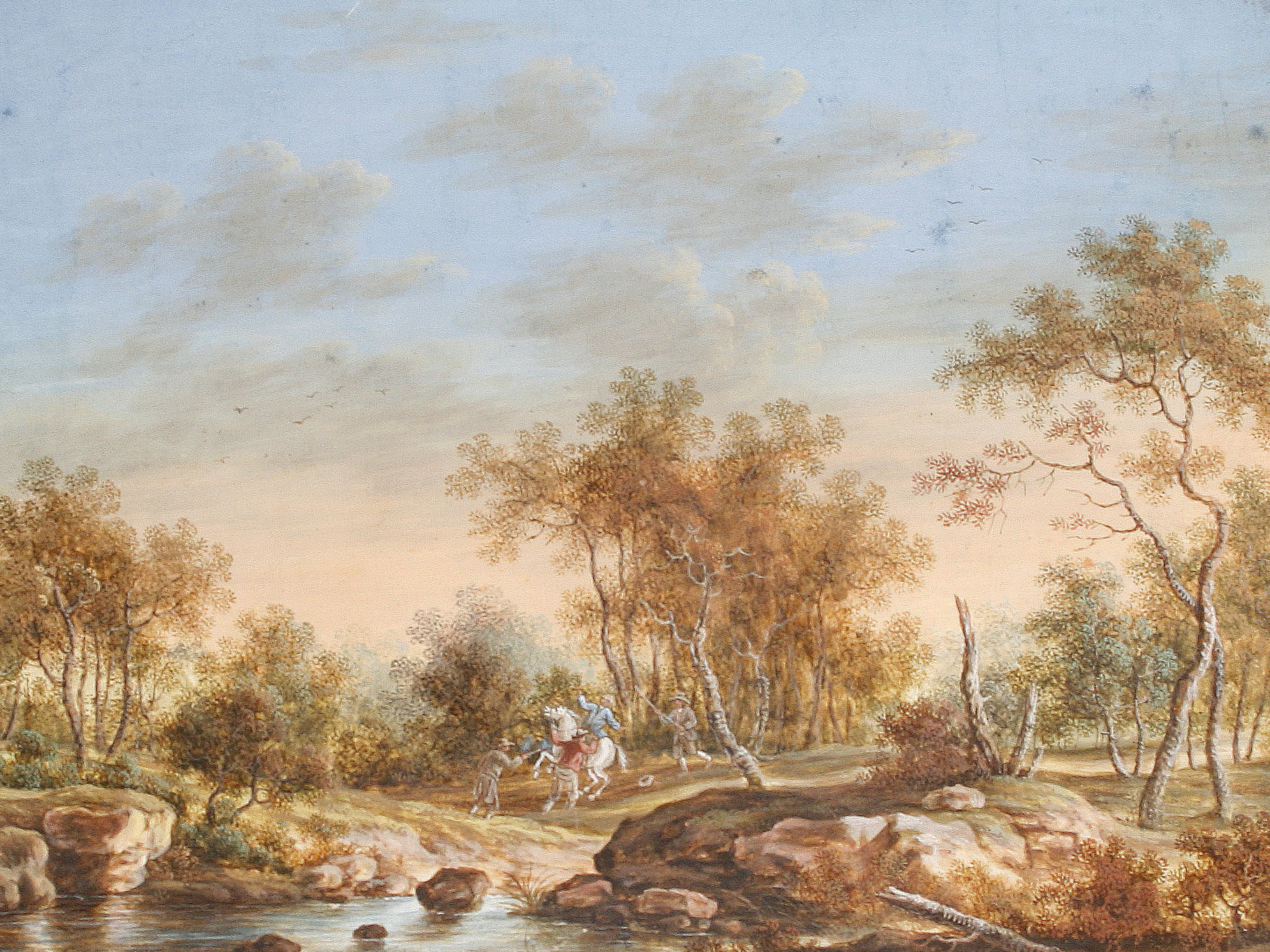
Bandits Shooting at Travellers

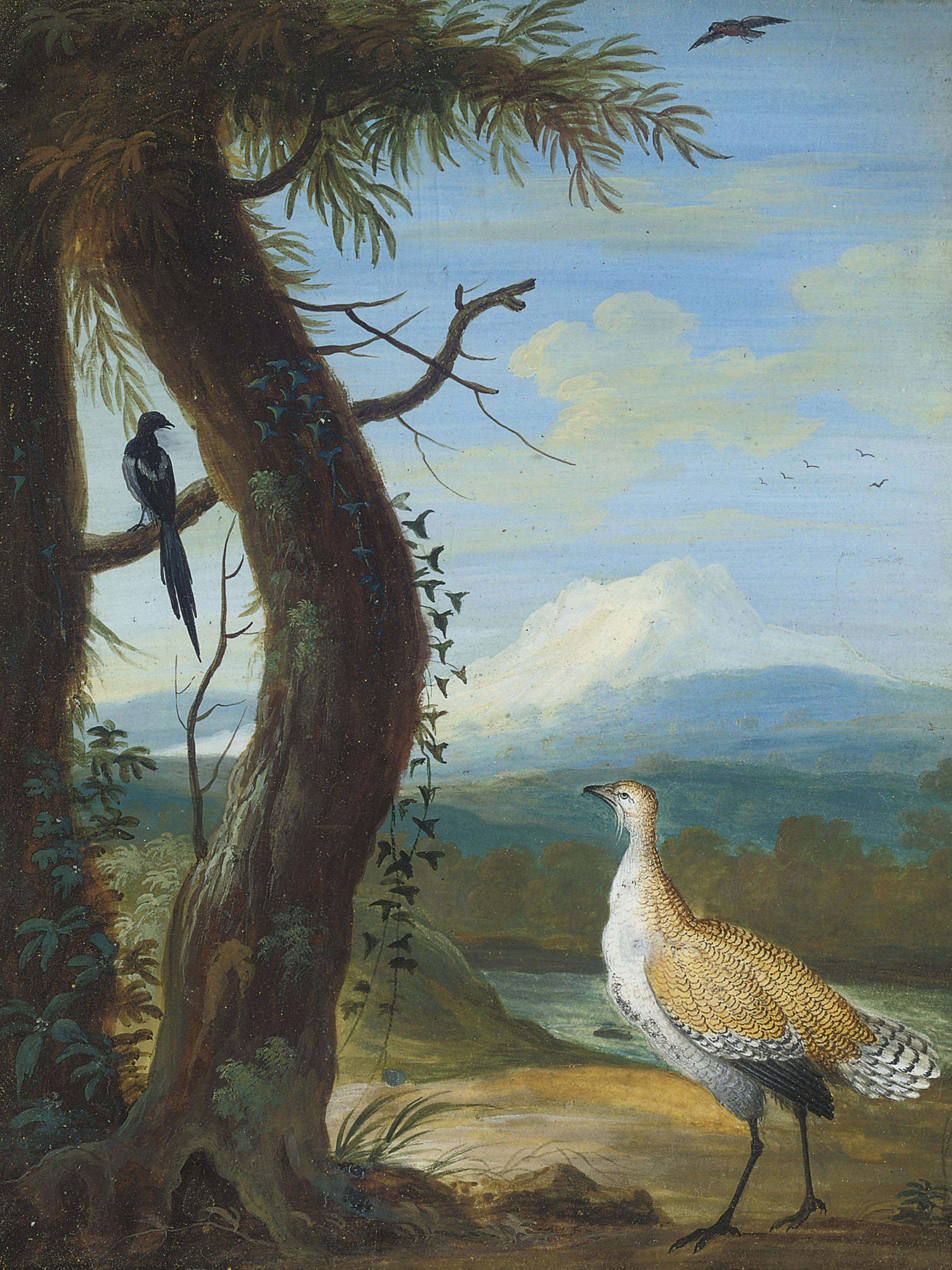
A bustard and a magpie in an exotic landscape

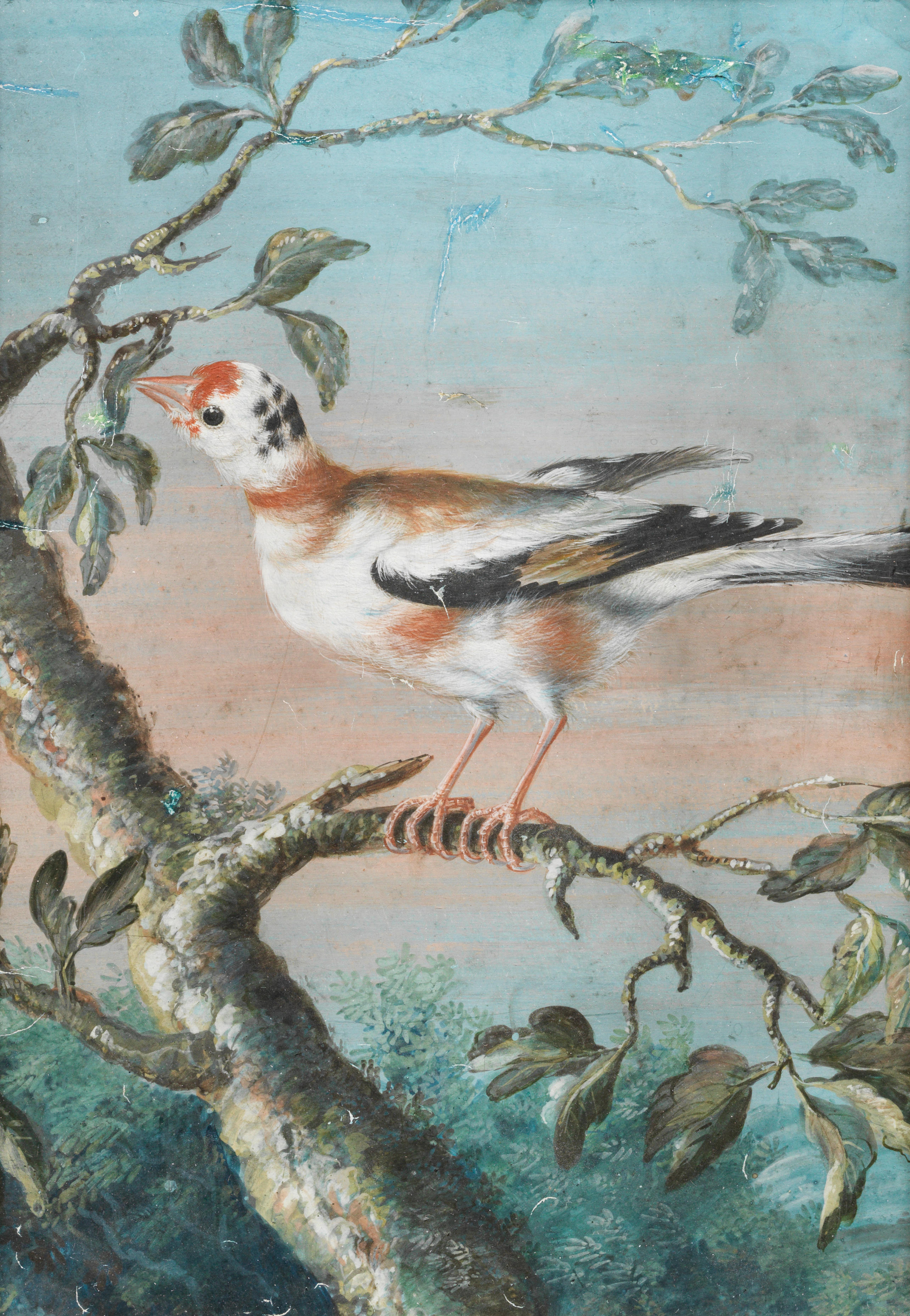
A bird seated on a branch

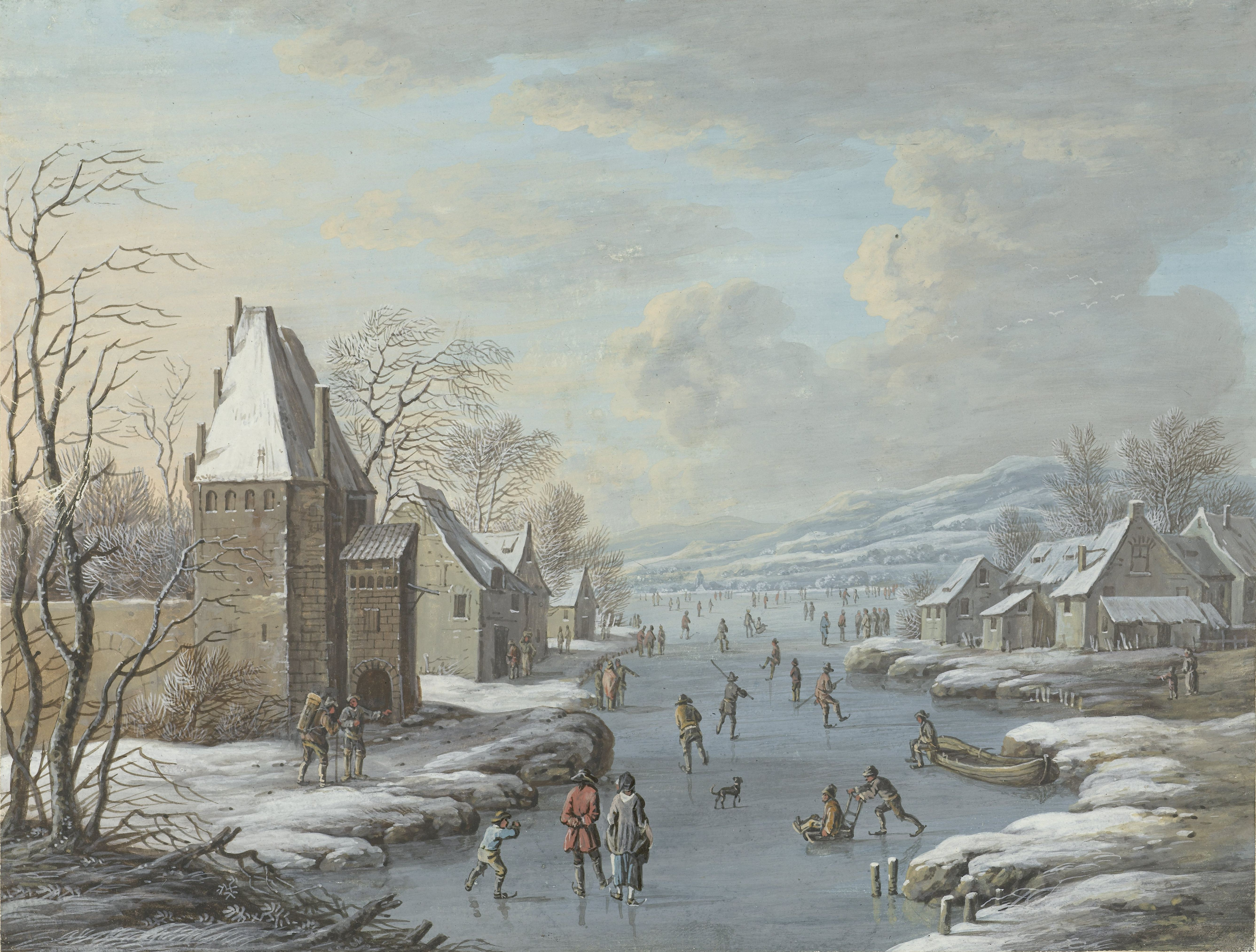
Winter face with ice entertainment

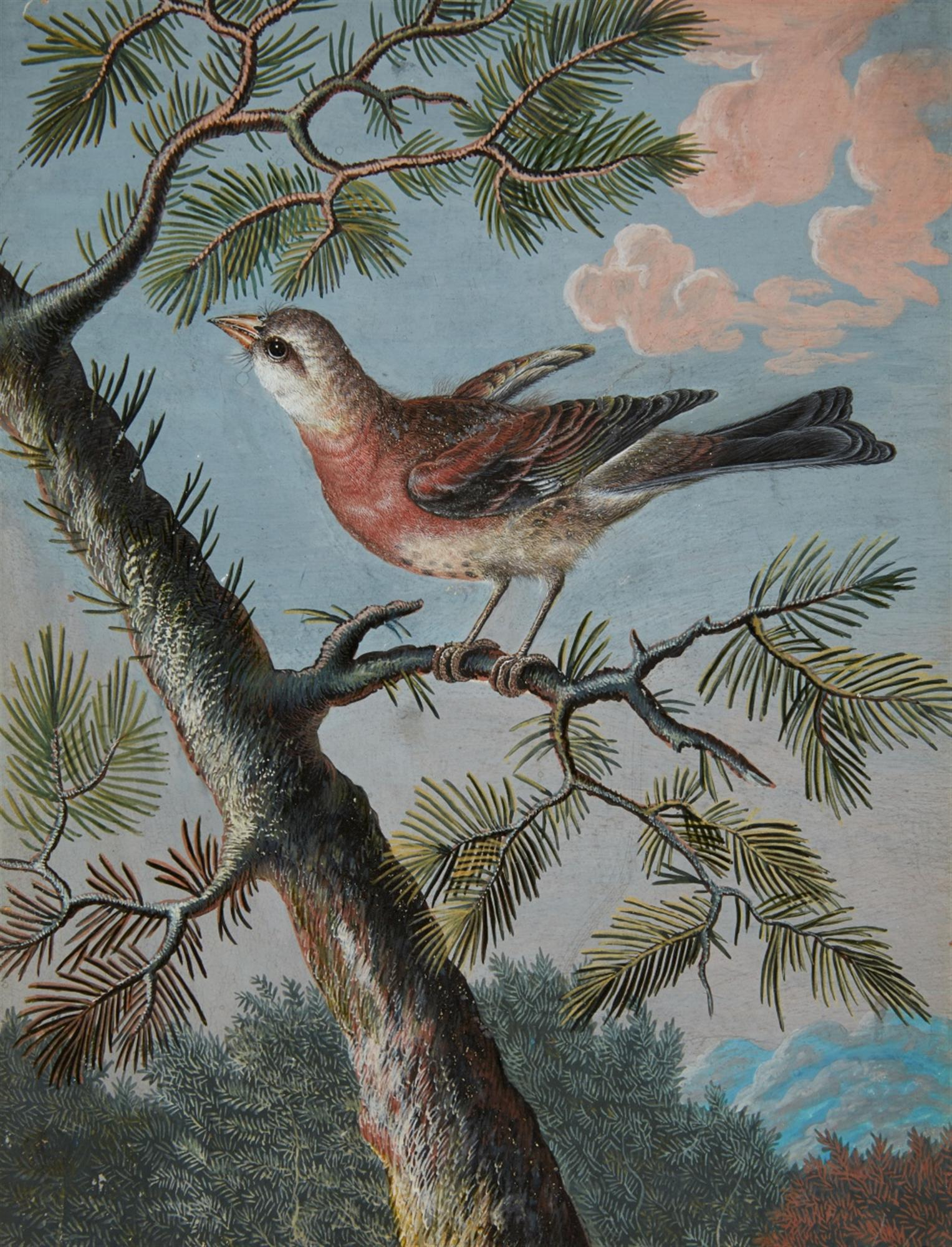
Songbird in an Evergreen
