= Juliane Wilhelmine Bause =

German painter & copper engraver (1768–1837)

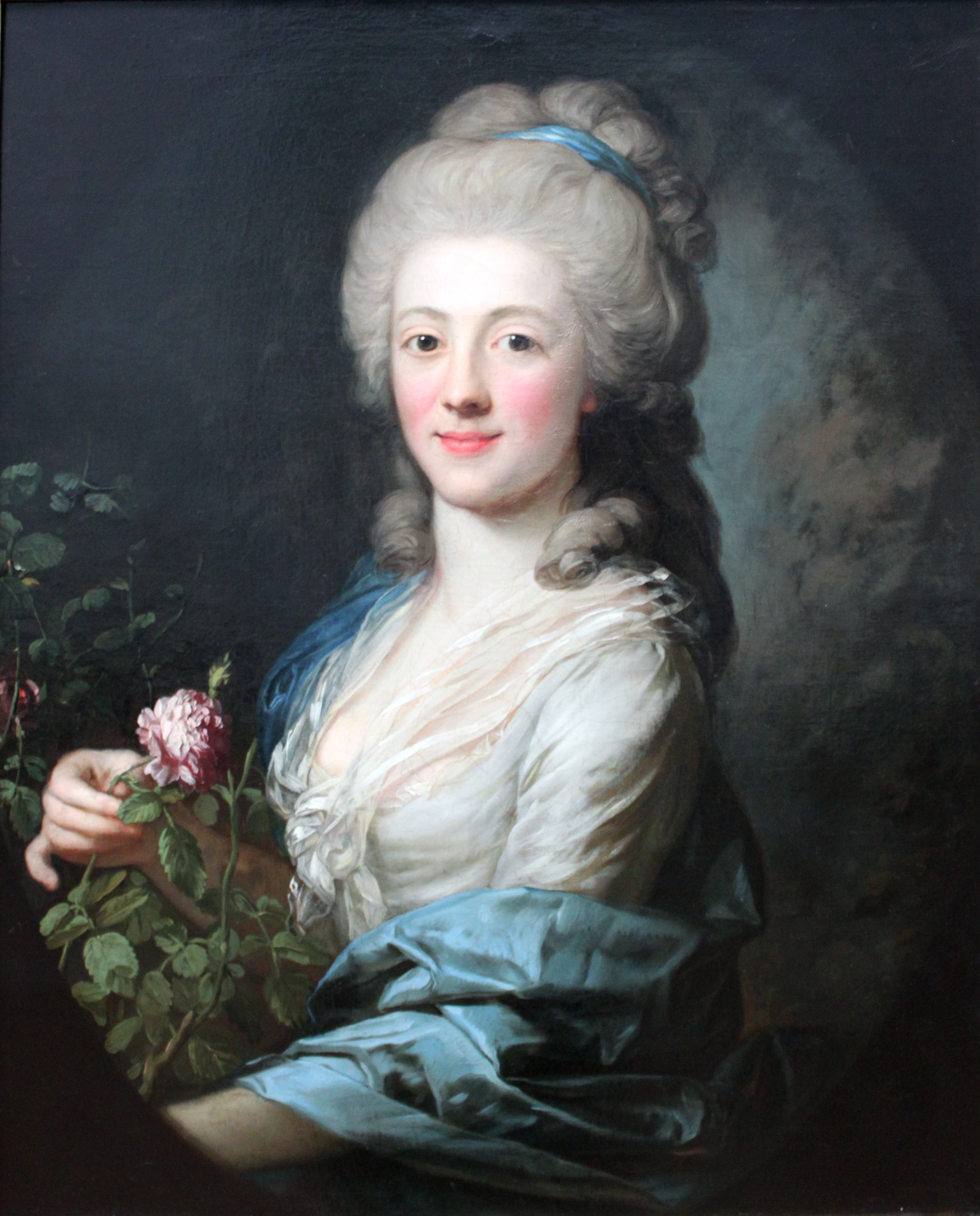
Juliane Wilhelmine Bause; portrait by Anton Graff (c.1785)

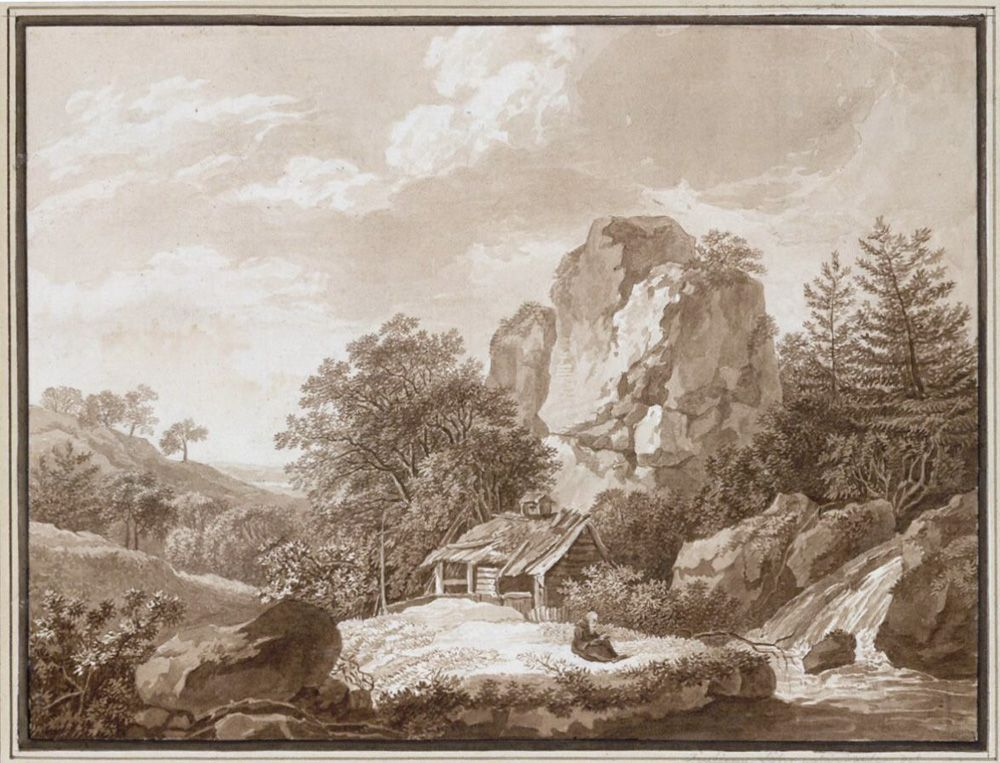
Landscape with Hermit

Juliane Wilhelmine Bause (4 July 1768, Leipzig - 8 August 1837, Leipzig) was a German painter and copper engraver.

== Life and work ==
She was the younger of two daughters born to the copper engraver, Johann Friedrich Bause, and his wife, Henriette Charlotte, née Brünner (1742–1818). Her father provided her first drawing lessons; later teaching her etching and engraving techniques. She met many prominent intellectuals when they visited his studio, including Goethe, Schiller and Charlotte von Stein. Her elder sister, Friederike Charlotte, was a talented musician, but died at the age of nineteen.

In 1792, she married the banker Carl Eberhard Löhr (1763–1813), son of the banker Eberhard Heinrich Löhr. When he died in 1798, they inherited his estate, Löhrs Garten, a large park with a spacious mansion. Shortly after her husband's death, she was expelled from the estate by General Jean Toussaint Arrighi de Casanova, the French Governor of Leipzig. She fled to Weimar, with her nineteen-year-old daughter, Henriette, accompanied by her father, who died there the following year.

In Weimar, Henriette met the poet and novelist, Johann Georg Keil, and they were married in 1814. Later that same year, they all returned to Leipzig and reclaimed the family estate, which had been damaged during the Battle of Leipzig. In addition to his literary work, Keil restored and expanded the gardens. He also managed the large collection of paintings that had belonged to Eberhard Heinrich Löhr, and a collection of graphics inherited from Johann Friedrich Bause.

Juliane's creative period was rather short, as it came to an effective end when she married Carl Eberhard. From 1789 to 1791, she etched a series of landscapes, after the Dutch Masters and a few recently deceased German artists; including Ferdinand Kobell and Johann Georg Wagner. These were distributed privately. There are also a few drawings and watercolors on original motifs.

The Stadtgeschichtliches Museum Leipzig has nine of her drawings and etchings. Other works may be found at the Albertina, the Staatliche Kunstsammlungen Dresden and the Philadelphia Museum of Art.
