= Johann Friedrich Bause =

German copper engraver (1738–1814)

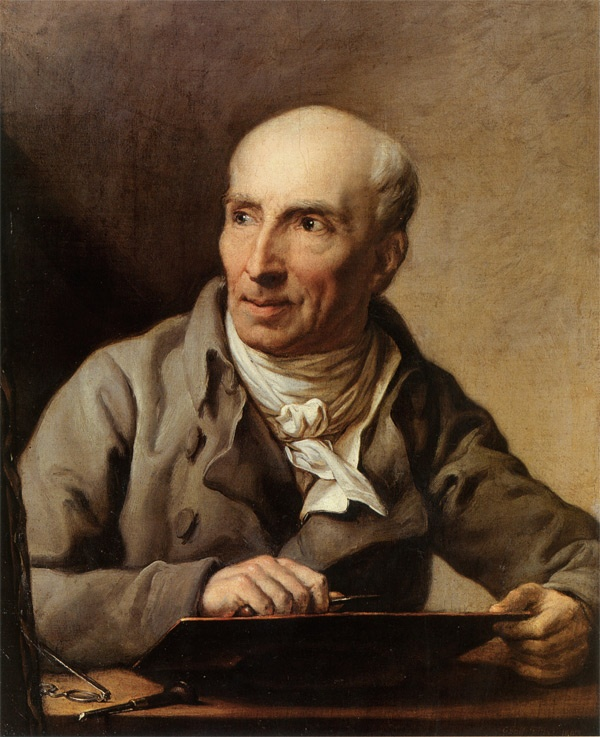
Johann Friedrich Bause; portrait by Anton Graff (1807)

Johann Friedrich Bause (3 January 1738 in Halle – 5 January 1814 in Weimar) was a German copper engraver; primarily of portraits.

== Life and work ==
He was initially self-taught. In 1759, he briefly worked in Augsburg, under the direction of Johann Jacob Haid. His inspiration came from the German expatriate engraver, Johann Georg Wille. While in Augsburg, he also made the acquaintance of portrait painter, Anton Graff.

In 1763, he married Henriette Charlotte Brünner, and they had two daughters. The eldest, Friederike Charlotte, had a talent for music, but died when she was only nineteen. The younger, Juliane Wilhelmine, married the banker, Karl Eberhard Löhr (1763–1813), son of the banker Eberhard Heinrich Löhr, in Leipzig. She also became an engraver and painter.

He moved from Halle to Leipzig in 1766, where he was named a Professor of copper engraving at the new Hochschule für Grafik und Buchkunst, and specialized in portraits. He also joined the famous Freemasons lodge, Minerva zu den drei Palmen. In 1786, he was named an honorary member of the Prussian Academy of the Arts.

His final engraving was made in 1809, when his eyesight was beginning to wane. In 1813, he followed Juliane (who had recently been widowed) to Weimar, when she was expelled from her estate by General Jean Toussaint Arrighi de Casanova, the French Governor of Leipzig.

== Works ==
His works, which are very numerous, are chiefly executed with the graver, which he handled with great purity and firmness. The following are his principal plates, except his portraits, which are chiefly of German characters of little celebrity:

- Damon and Musidora, subject from Thomson; after Bach.
- A Moonlight Scene; after the same.
- The Magdalene; from a drawing by Bach, after Batoni.
- Three Apostles; after Caravaggio; etching.
- Venus and Cupid; after Carlo Cignani.
- Michael Ehrlich; after B. Denner; a mezzotint.
- The Repentance of St. Peter; after Dietrich.
- The Good Housewife; after G. Dou.
- Bust of a Girl; after Greuze.
- Artemisia; after Guido.
- The Head of Christ; after the same.
- The Old Confidante; after Kupetsky.
- Cupid feeling the Point of an Arrow after Mengs.
- Bust of a Girl, with a Basket of Boses; after Netscher.
- The Sacrifice of Abraham; after Oeser.
- La petite Rusée; after Reynolds.

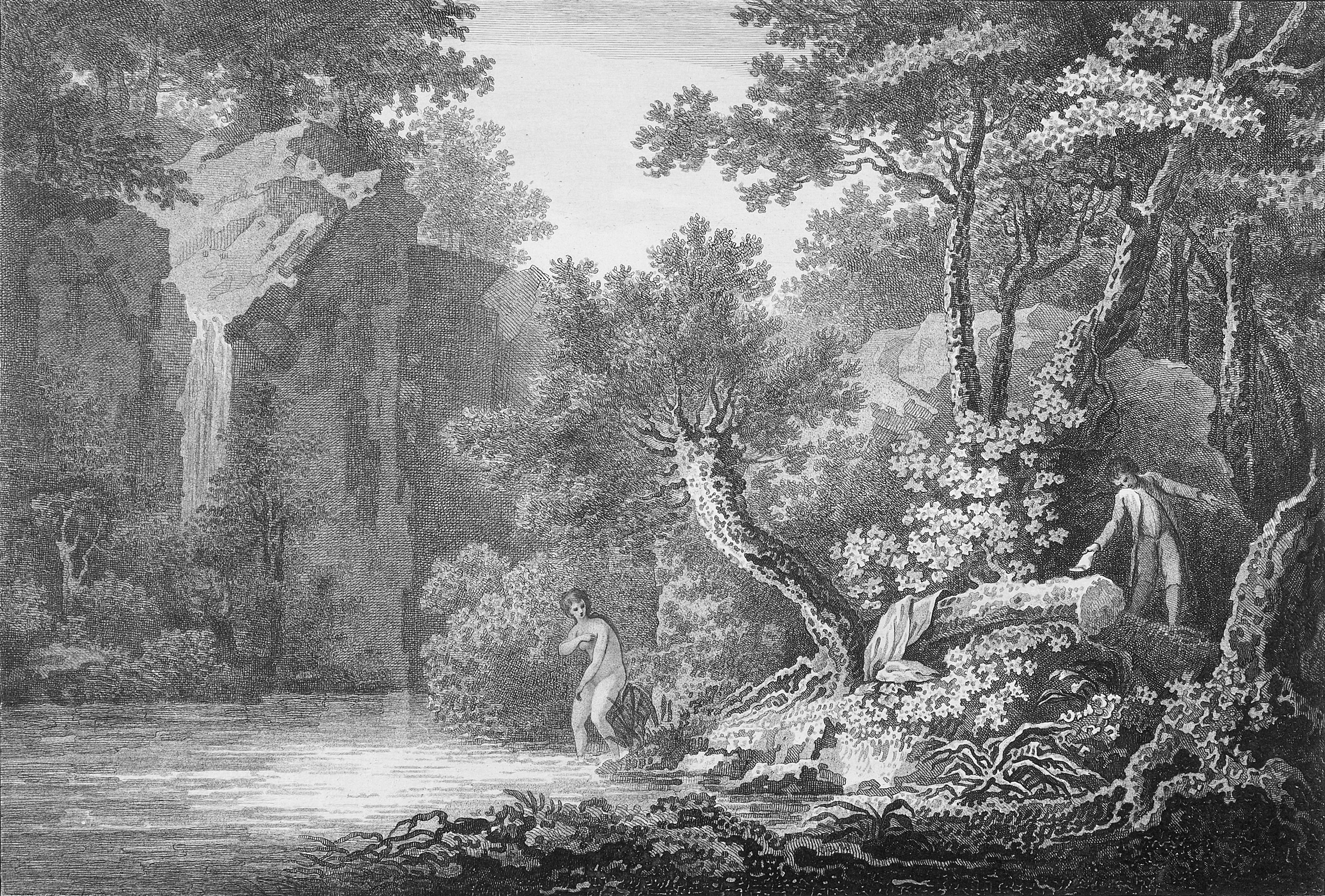
Damos and Musidora; inspired by Summer; a poem by James Thomson

A list of his works may be found in Nagler and Heineken. See also Dr. G. Keil's Katalog des Kupferstichwerkes von Johann Friedrich Bause, Leipzig, 1849. His daughter, Juliane, etched a number of landscapes after Kobell, Both, and other artists.
