= Anton Graff =

Swiss portrait artist (1736–1813)

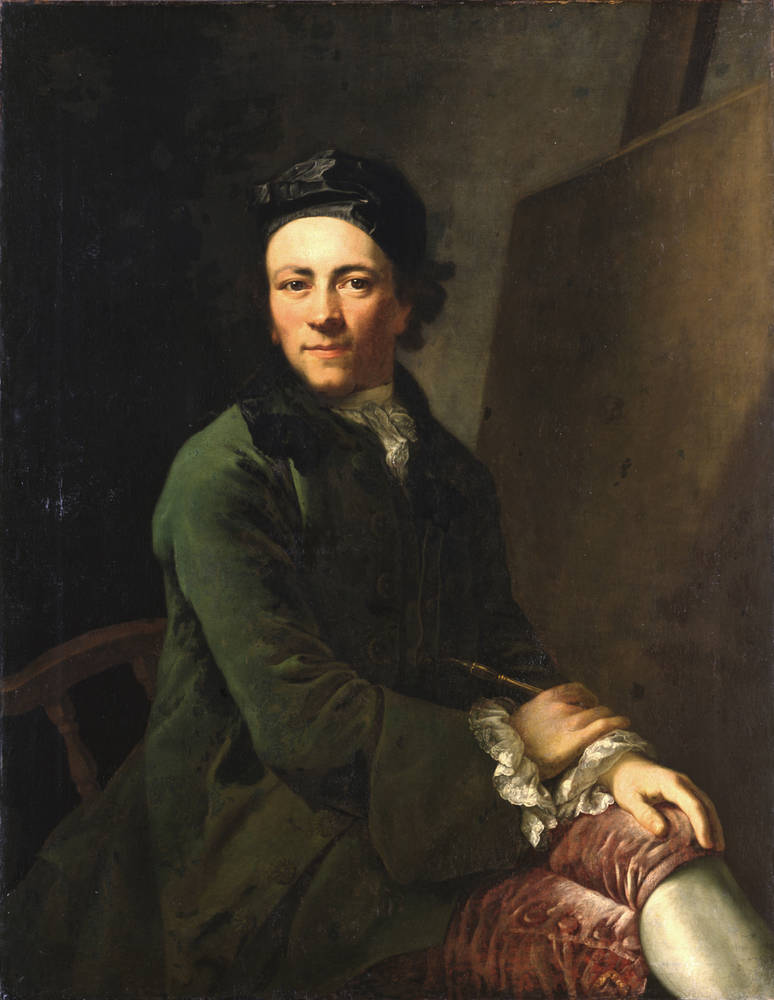
- Self-portrait (1765)
- Born: 18 November 1736; Winterthur, Swiss Confederacy
- Died: 22 June 1813 (aged 76); Dresden, Kingdom of Saxony
- Education: Johann Ulrich Schellenberg, Johann Jacob Haid, Leonhard Schneider
- Known for: Portrait Painting
- Notable work: Portrait of Frederick the Great (1781). His masterpiece
- Movement: Neoclassicism
- Awards: 1783: Honorary Member of the Akademie der Künste, Berlin, 1812: Honorary Member of the Academy of Fine Arts, Vienna and the Academy of Fine Arts, Munich
- Patrons: Royal Courts of Prussia and Saxony

Anton Graff (18 November 1736 – 22 June 1813) was a Swiss portrait artist.

Among his famous subjects were Friedrich Schiller, Christoph Willibald Gluck, Heinrich von Kleist, Frederick the Great, Friederike Sophie Seyler, Johann Gottfried Herder, Gotthold Ephraim Lessing, Moses Mendelssohn and Christian Felix Weiße. His pupils included Emma Körner, Philipp Otto Runge and Karl Ludwig Kaaz.

== Life and work ==
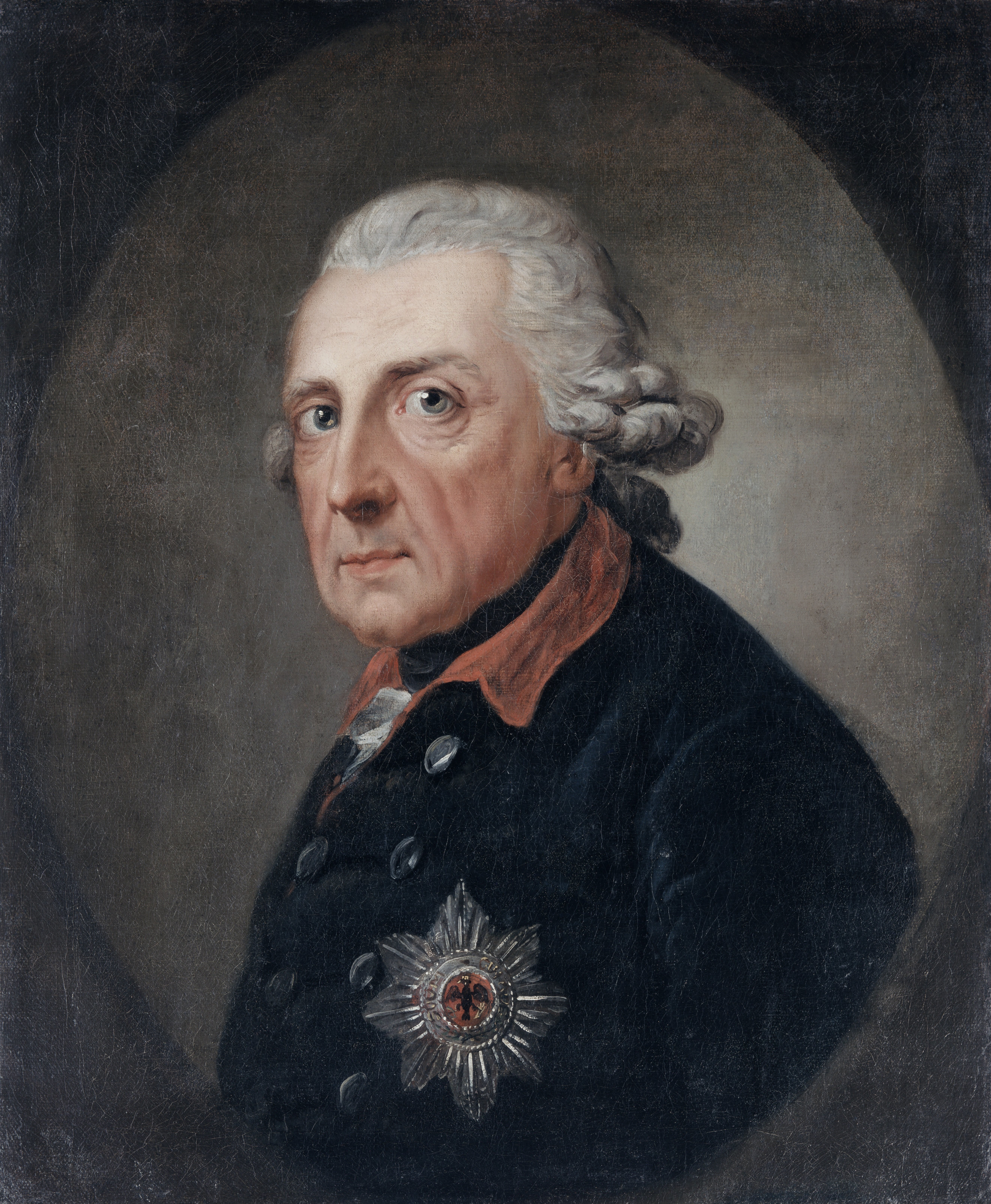
Frederick the Great, King of Prussia (1781). This portrait is regarded as Graff's masterpiece. Contemporaries claimed it was the best, most accurate portrait of Frederick. It is the most famous, copied and reproduced portrait of the King.

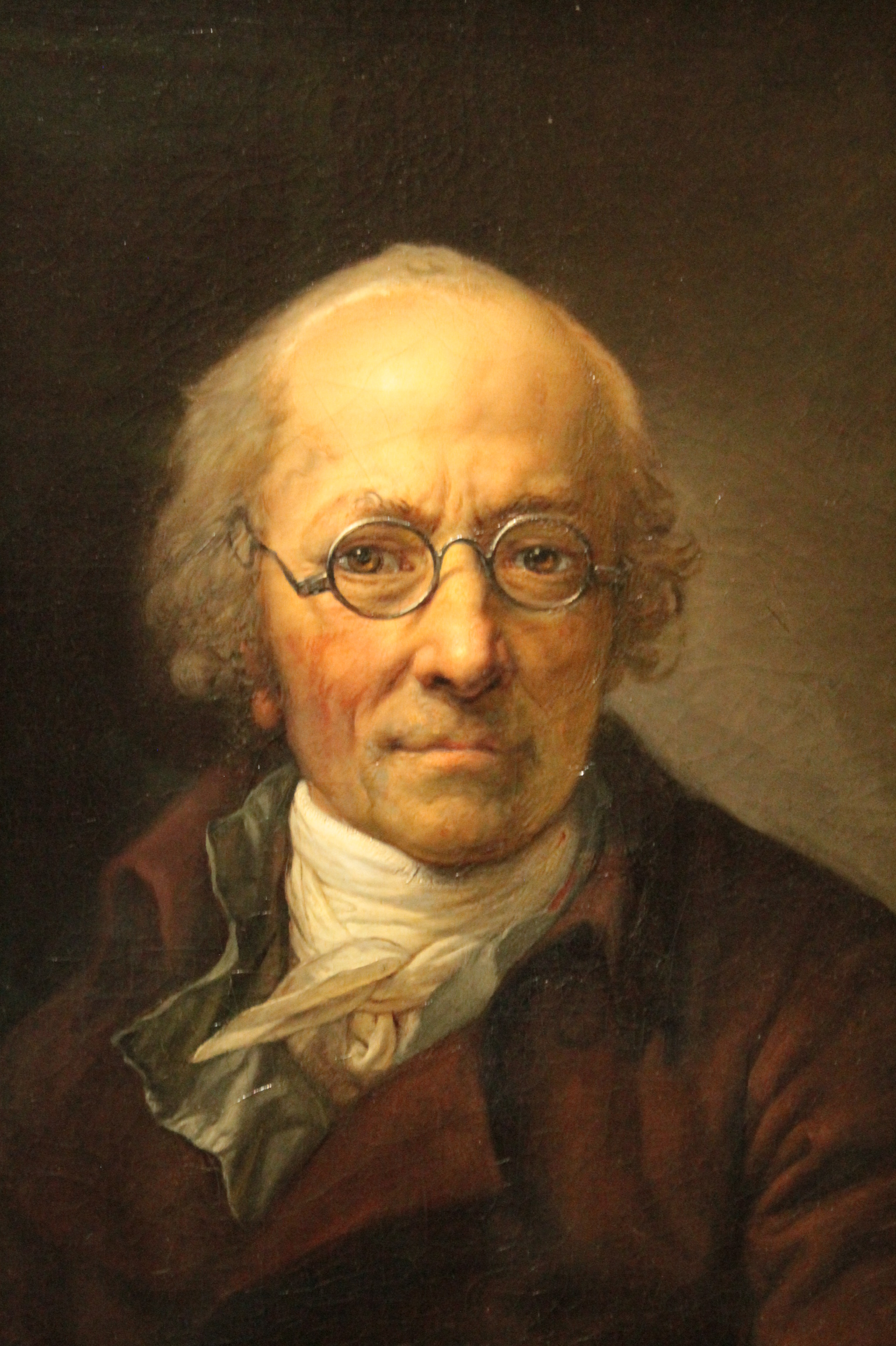
Anton Graff self-portrait 1805, Gallery of Old Masters, Dresden

Anton Graff was born as the seventh child of the craftsman Ulrich Graff and Barbara Graff née Koller, at Untertorgasse 8 in Winterthur, Switzerland (the house no longer exists). In 1753, Graff started studying painting at the art school of Johann Ulrich Schellenberg, in Winterthur. After three years he left for Augsburg. There he worked with the etcher Johann Jakob Haid. However, only one year later he was forced to leave Augsburg. He was too successful, and the members of the local painters guild feared his competition. With a letter of recommendation from Johann Jakob Haid, he moved to Ansbach where he found employment with the court painter Leonhard Schneider until 1759. Graff travelled frequently to Munich to study paintings in different collections. In 1759, he went back to Augsburg and later moved to Regensburg. In 1765 he went back to Winterthur and Zurich. It was there he received an invitation from Christian Ludwig von Hagedorn, the newly appointed Director of the recently established Dresden Art Academy, to apply for a post. Graff hesitated, he thought he was not good enough to work for the princely court of Saxony. To give Hagedorn an impression of his talent he sent a self-portrait. It arrived on 16 January 1766, in Dresden and was so well received, that only one day later Hagedorn worked out Graff's employment contract. On 7 April 1766, Graff arrived in Dresden, where he was appointed court painter and teacher for portrait painting at the academy. He kept the academy post for life, although he got better paid offers at other academies. In early 1788, the Prussian Minister Friedrich Anton von Heynitz made Graff the very financially attractive offer to work for the Prussian Academy of Arts in Berlin. On 7 May 1789, Graff informed Count Camillo Marcolini, general director of the Dresden Art Academy, about this. Marcolini reacted straight away. On 20 June 1789, Graff was appointed Professor for portrait painting at the Dresden Art Academy.

Graff made portraits of nearly 1,000 of his contemporaries and was the leading portrait painter in Germany, in the late 18th and early 19th century. Graff was the main portrait painter of German poets between the Enlightenment and early Romantic periods. Many were also his friends, like Johann Wolfgang von Goethe, whom he met in Dresden in 1768. Graff was the favourite portrait painter of the German, Russian, Polish and Baltic nobility. Among others he portrayed Stanislaw Kostka Potocki. His most important clients included Catherine the Great of Russia and Frederick the Great of Prussia. His portrait of Frederick is regarded as his masterpiece. The painting is exhibited at Schloss Charlottenburg. Frederick the Great never posed for Graff. However, Graff received authorization to watch Frederick at a military parade in 1781. This gave Graff the chance to study the physiognomy of the King, and was therefore the basis for his portrait.

Graff was popular with the landed gentry, diplomats, musicians and scholars. He portrayed many of them. While painting a portrait, Graff always focused the light on the person's face. In Graff's portraits it was always the face that got the attention and the light, except when the sitter was a lady. In that case he also focused on the lady's décolleté. Graff was a master of light and shadow. His role model in this context was Ján Kupecký whose works he studied in the collections of Ansbach. In comparison with the calmness of the ladies, the gentlemen in his portraits often appear serious and reserved.

He also knew how to paint dresses and draperies of different materials and colours in a natural way. His role model in this field was the French court painter Hyacinthe Rigaud. In 1765/66 Graff portrayed Elisabeth Sulzer in a blue silk dress with silver laces and fur collar and borders.

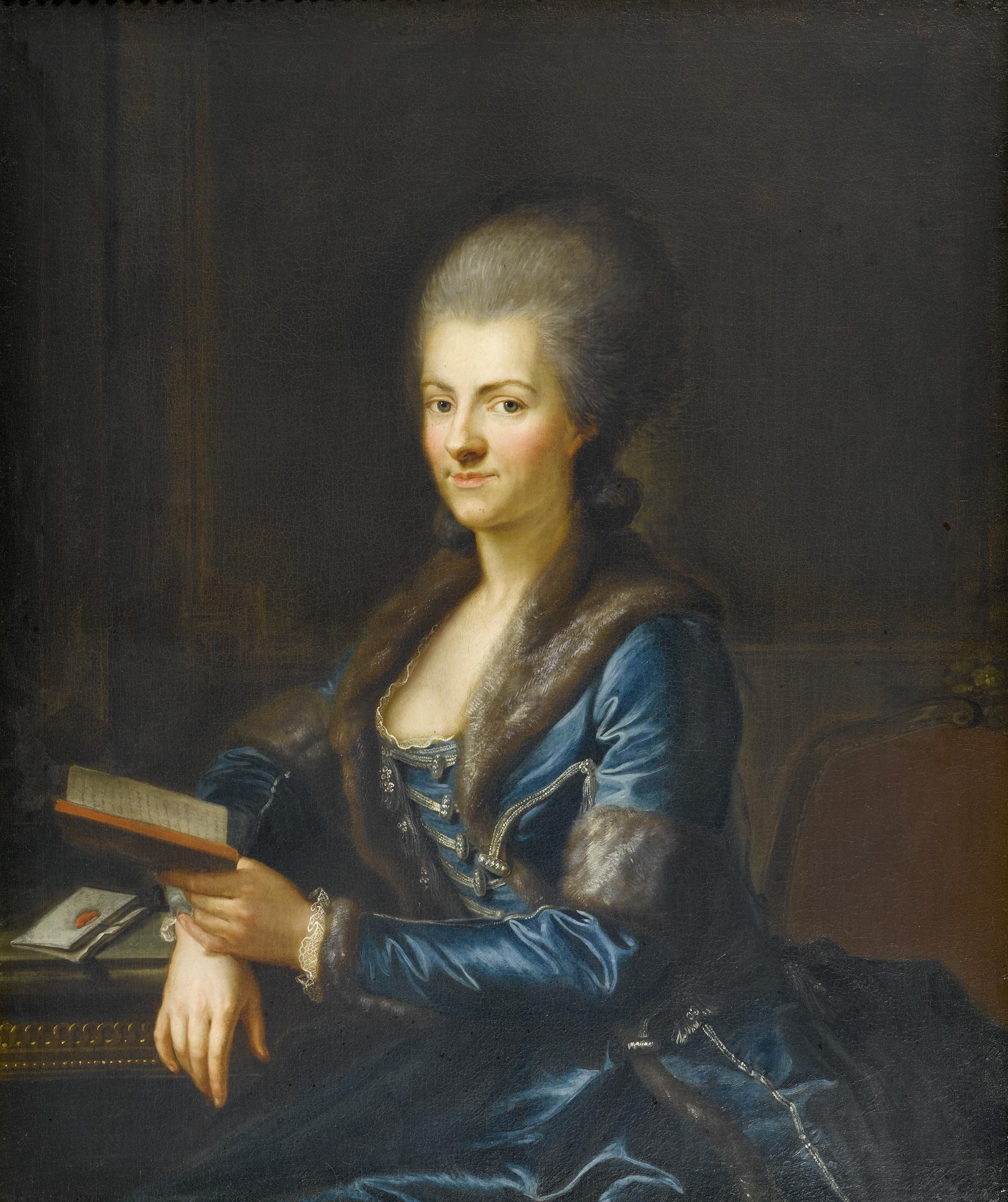
Elisabeth Sulzer, née Reinhart (1765/66). Sulzer and Oskar Reinhart have common ancestors; Reinhart was a patron of the arts and collector.

In his early years, Graff hardly ever painted any background details. He usually kept the background monochrome. However, in later years he paid more attention to the background. Usually he painted the sitter in outdoor surroundings, as was the fashion at that time in England. The price for a portrait by Graff was calculated by size and details of the sitter's clothes. That it was not always easy for Graff to portrait the famous shows the remark he made while painting Friedrich Schiller: "He cannot sit still." Graff was much in demand and he could live a comfortable life with his income.

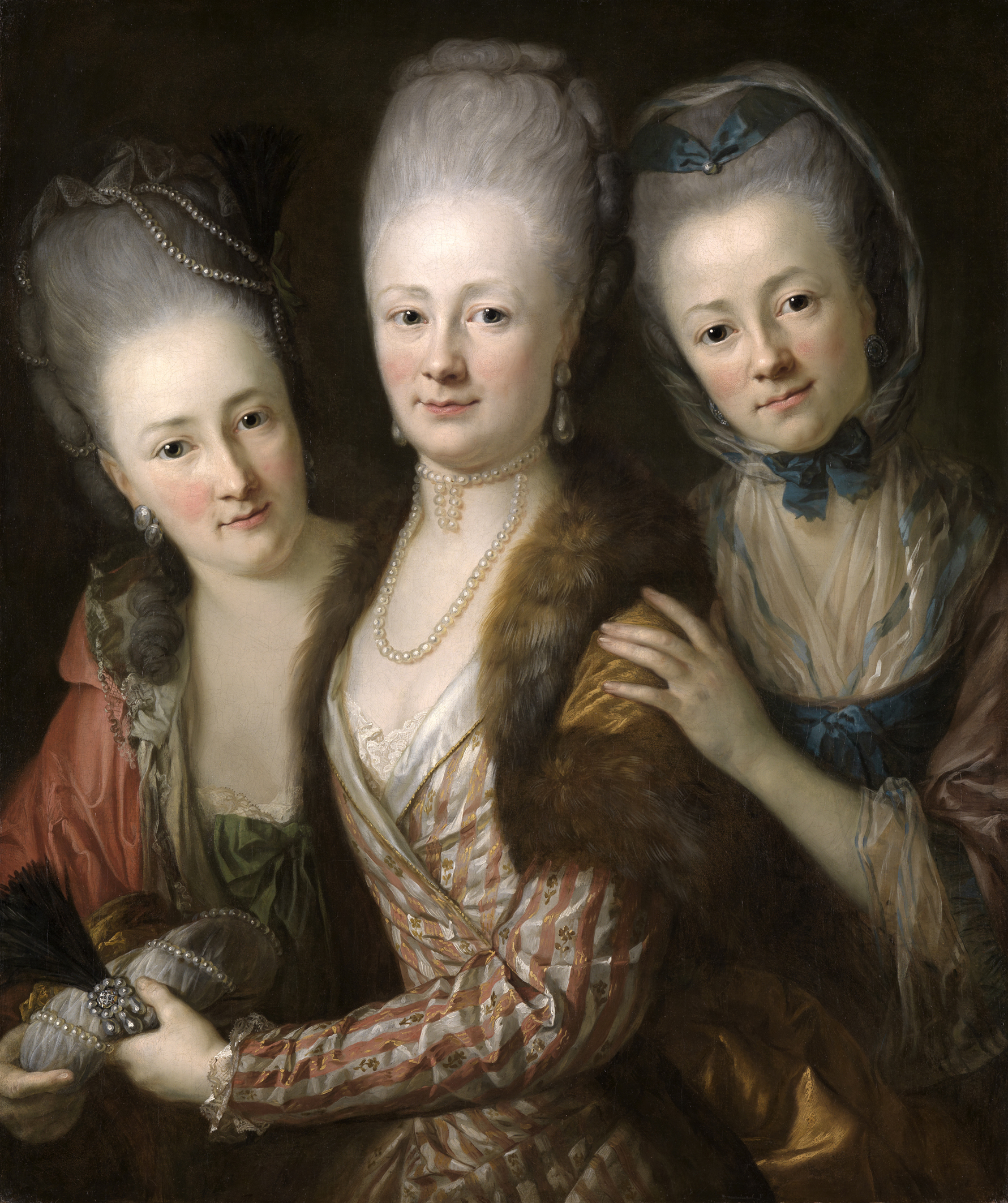
Portrait of the daughters of Johann Julius von Vieth und Golssenau (1713–1784) and wife Johanna Juliane, née Krieg von Bellicken (painted around 1775). Von Vieth was a nobleman at the princely court of Saxony. This painting was sold at Christie's in 2002 for £111,150.

In 1769 Graff met Philipp Erasmus Reich, a well known bookseller and publisher in Leipzig. Reich became a good friend of Graff. He engaged him to portrait his scholar friends. In September 1771, Graff travelled to Berlin and portrayed Gotthold Ephraim Lessing in Johann Georg Sulzer's apartment. Lessing's comment on his portrait was: "Do I really look that terribly nice?" In Berlin Graff also portrayed Moses Mendelssohn and Johann Georg Sulzer, his future father-in-law.

In his later years Graff turned to painting landscapes and developed a sparkling manner of painting that anticipated Impressionism. Philipp Otto Runge and Caspar David Friedrich were influenced by his work.

Graff was a sociable person. He cultivated friendships with many of his sitters, business partners and colleagues such as the Polish engraver Daniel Chodowiecki, the Swiss painters Salomon Gessner and Adrian Zingg and the Saxon engraver Johann Friedrich Bause. Bause reproduced many of Graff's portraits as engravings. This made Graff's name and his artworks well known with the public. Graff travelled quite often to Berlin. His father-in-law, Johann Georg Sulzer, introduced him to members of the Prussian court. He became very popular with the Prussian nobility and they were good customers for him. In 1778 he closed his short autobiography with: "Berlin habe ich viel zu verdanken" (I owe Berlin much).

On 16 October 1771, Graff married Elisabetha Sophie Augusta Sulzer, called "Guste". They had 5 children. The first daughter, Johanna Catharina Henrietta, died the same year she was born in 1772. Another daughter was born in 1779 and died only a few months later. His second son, Georg, died in 1801. In 1803 Graff underwent cataract surgery. His wife Elisabeth died in 1812. Graff himself died of typhoid fever on 22 June 1813, at around 8pm in Dresden. He was 76 years old. He left his two surviving children, Caroline Susanne (she married the painter Karl Ludwig Kaaz, a pupil of Graff) and Carl Anton (he became a landscapist), a fortune of 40,000 Thaler. Graff was buried in Dresden. His tomb does not exist anymore.

Graff was a prolific artist. He painted some 2,000 paintings and drawings. His paintings, especially the portraits, are much sought after. Many of them are in museums and private collections in Switzerland (Museum Oskar Reinhart), Germany (Staatliche Kunstsammlungen Dresden), Russia (Hermitage Museum), Estonia (Kadriorg Palace, Tallinn) and Poland (National Museum, Warsaw). The portraits of gentlemen outnumber the portraits of ladies.

In honour of their famous citizen the Berufsbildungsschule Winterthur (BBW) (School for Vocational Training) named their building after Graff. The "Anton-Graff-Haus". In Winterthur and Dresden there are streets named after Anton Graff. 2013 Jubilee exhibitions took place in the Museum Oskar Reinhart, Winterthur, and in the Old National Gallery in Berlin.

== Gallery ==
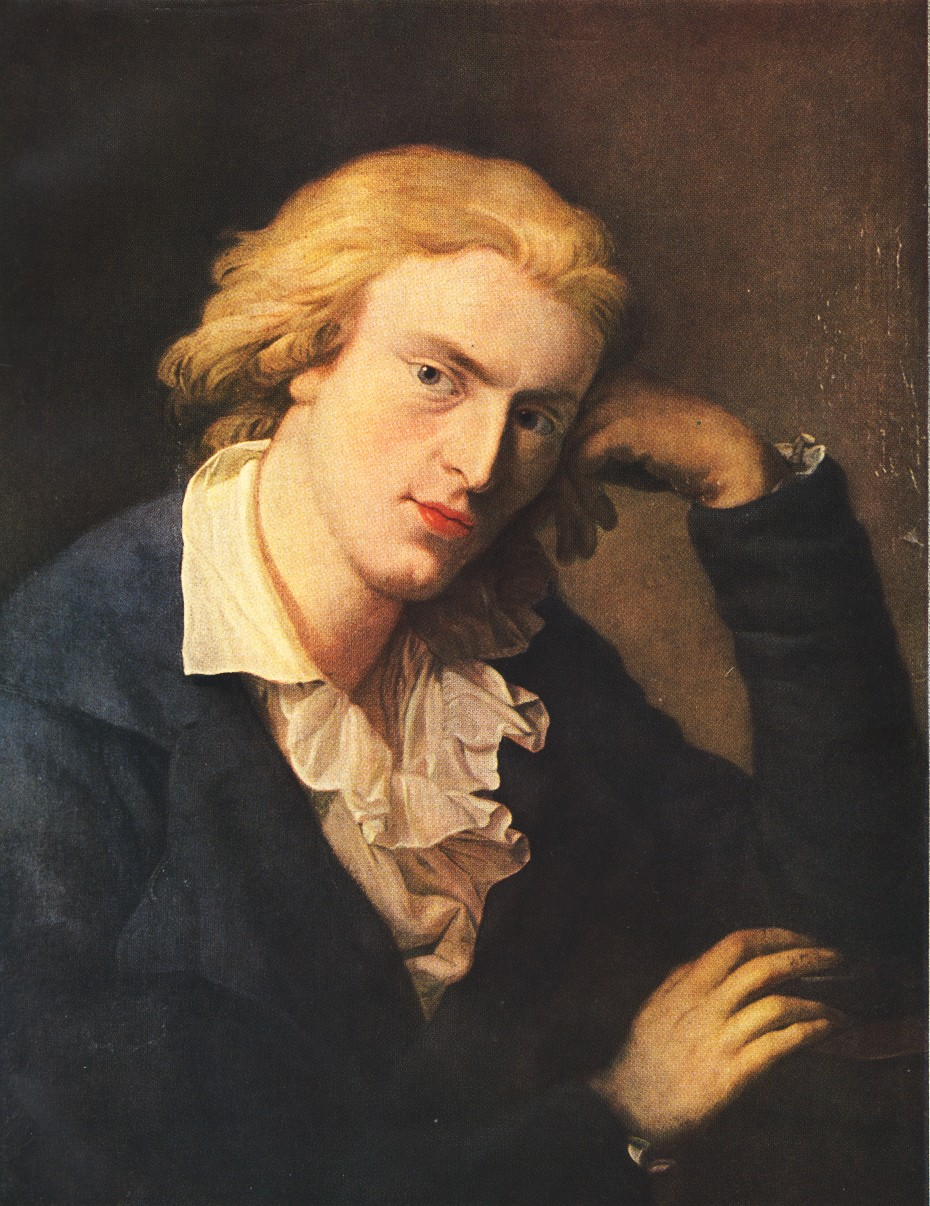
Friedrich Schiller. Graff started it in 1786, and finished in 1791. It was often copied. The original is at Dresden's "Kügelgenhaus".

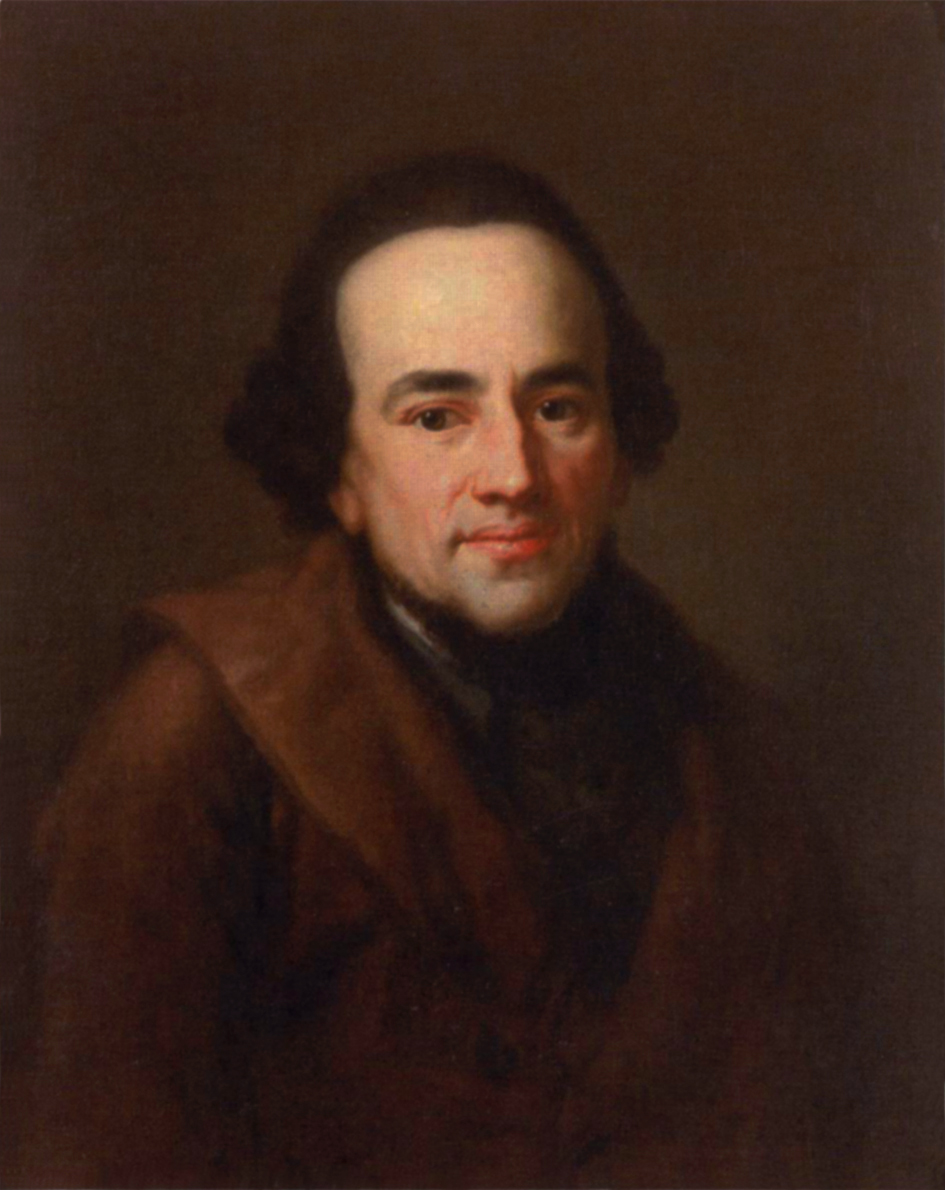
Moses Mendelssohn (1771).

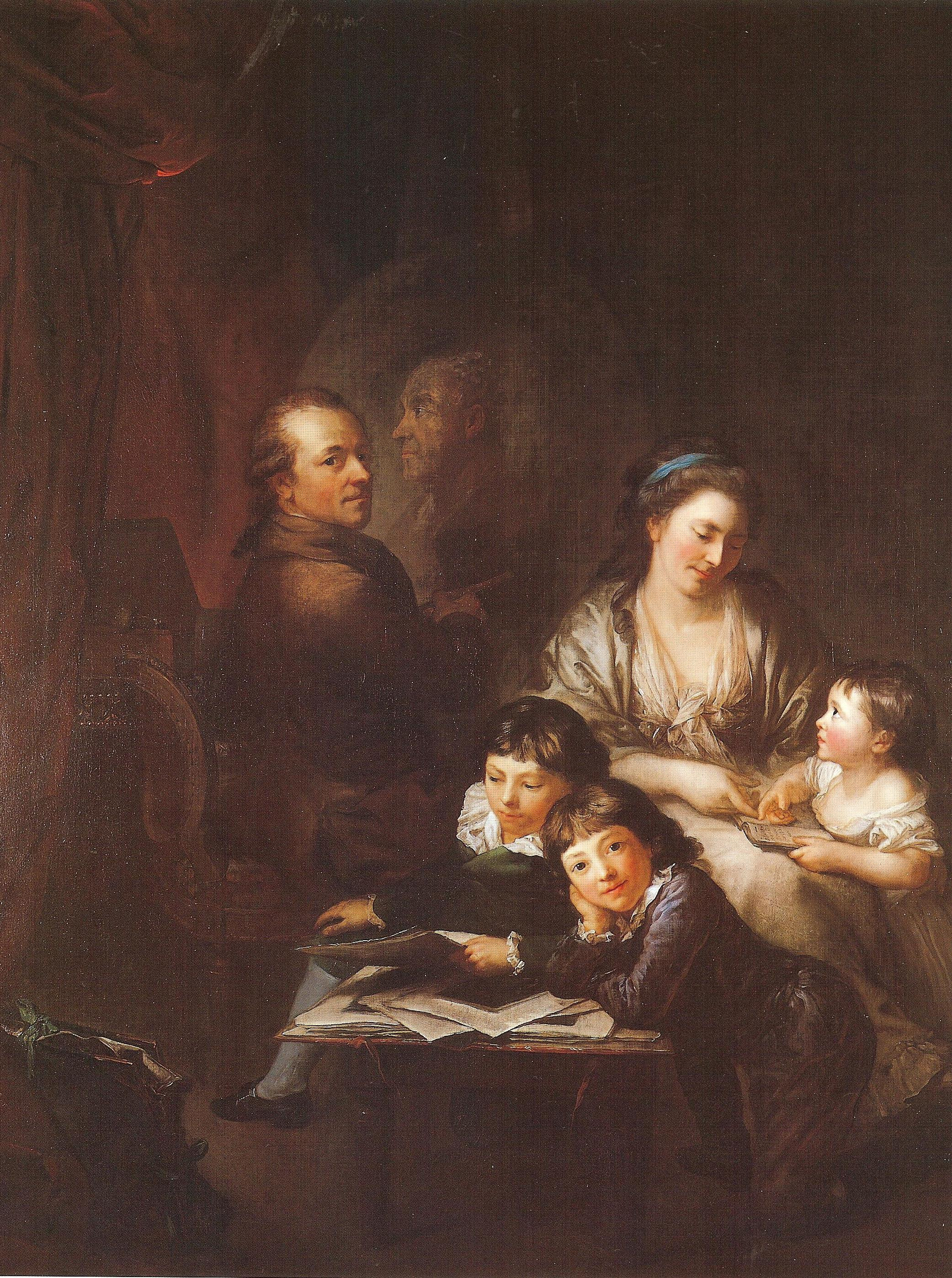
Self-portrait, Anton Graff and his family (1785). This painting is in the Museum Oskar Reinhart in Winterthur.

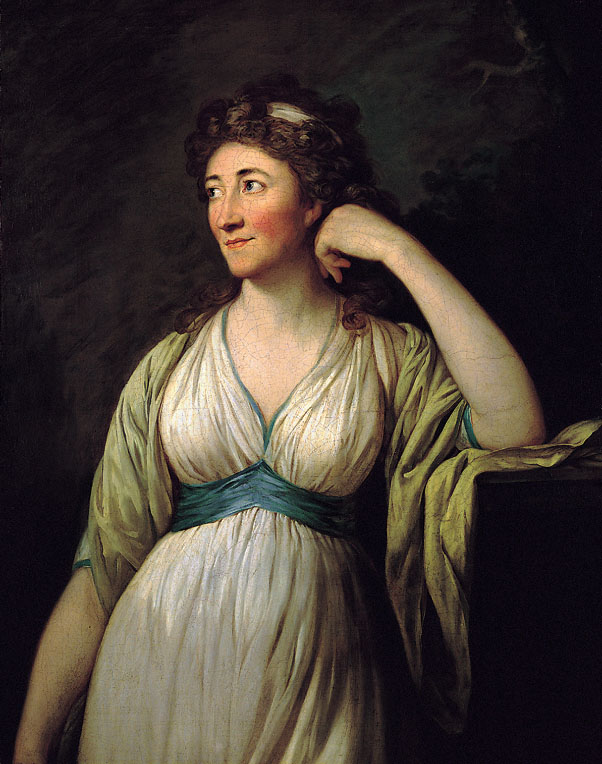
Elisa von der Recke (1797).

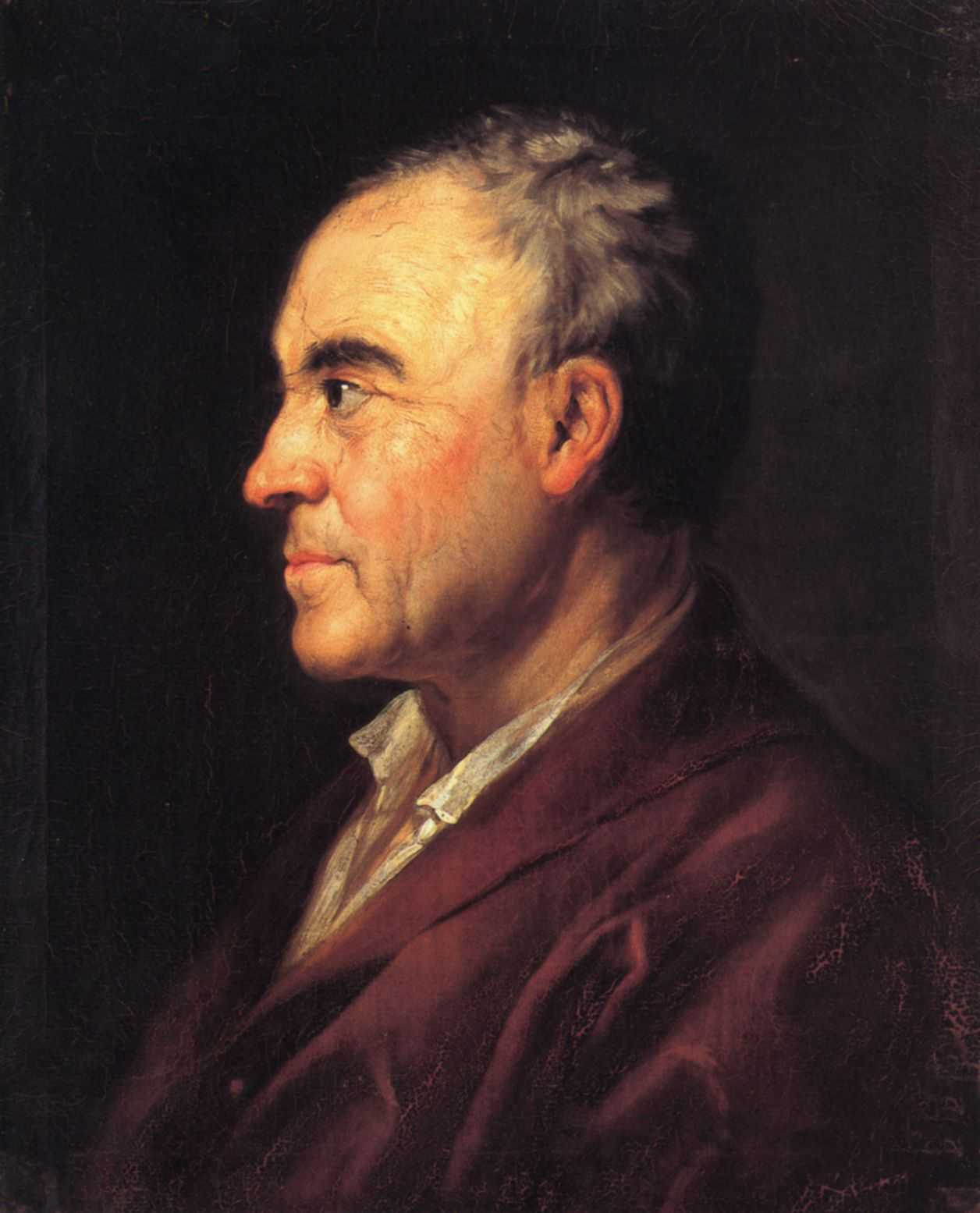
Johann Georg Sulzer (1774). Anton Graff's father-in-law.

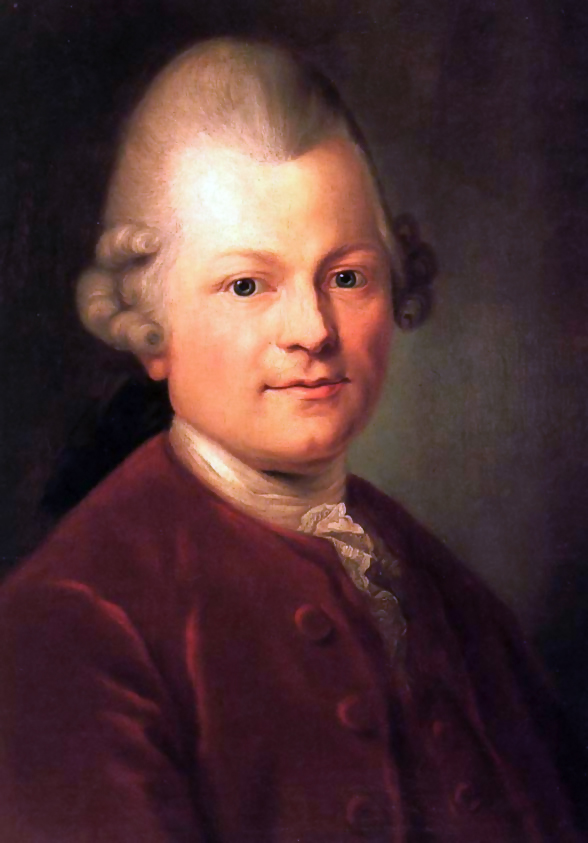
Gotthold Ephraim Lessing (1771).

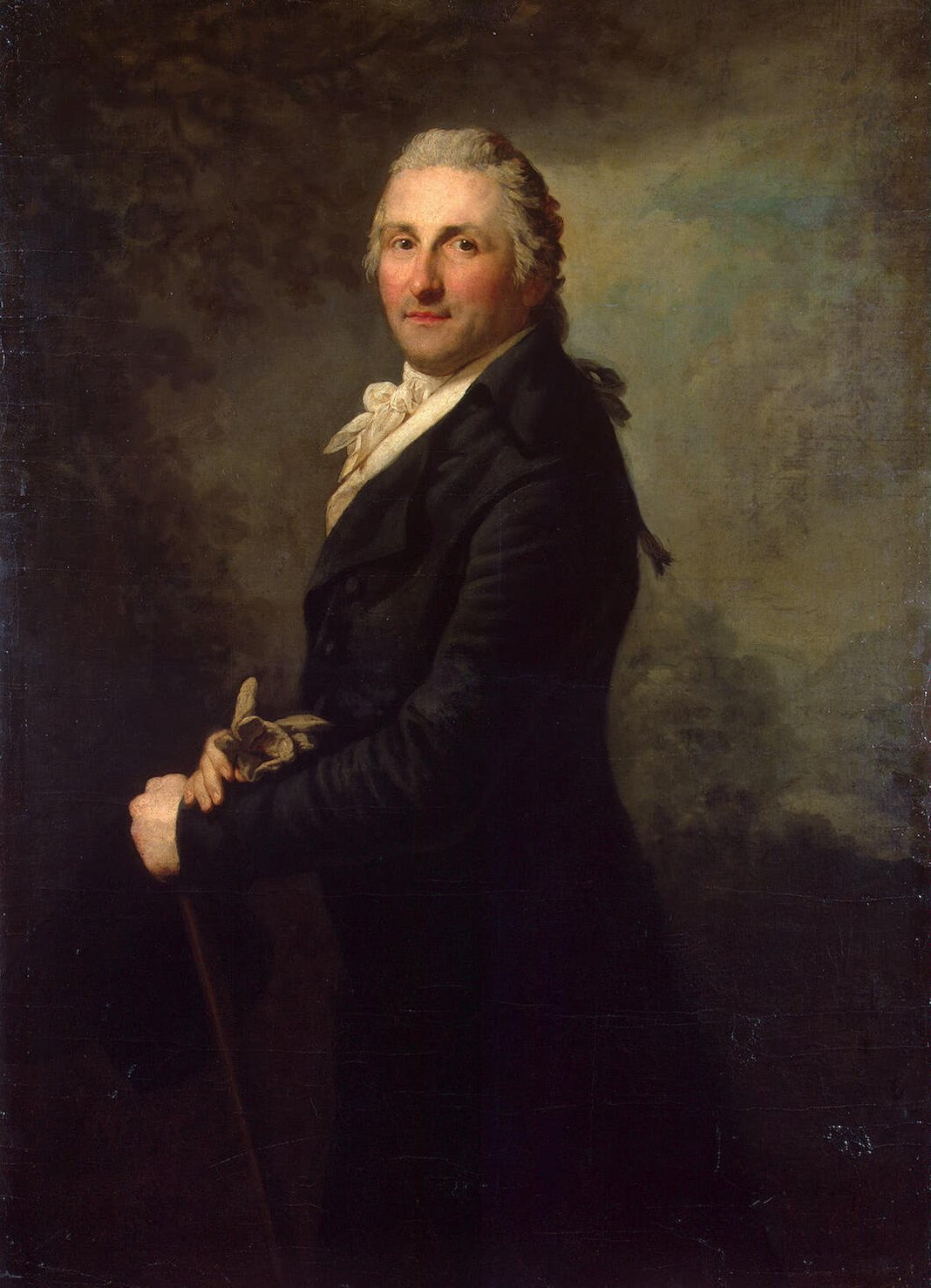
George Leopold Gogel (1796). This painting is at the Hermitage Museum in Saint Petersburg.

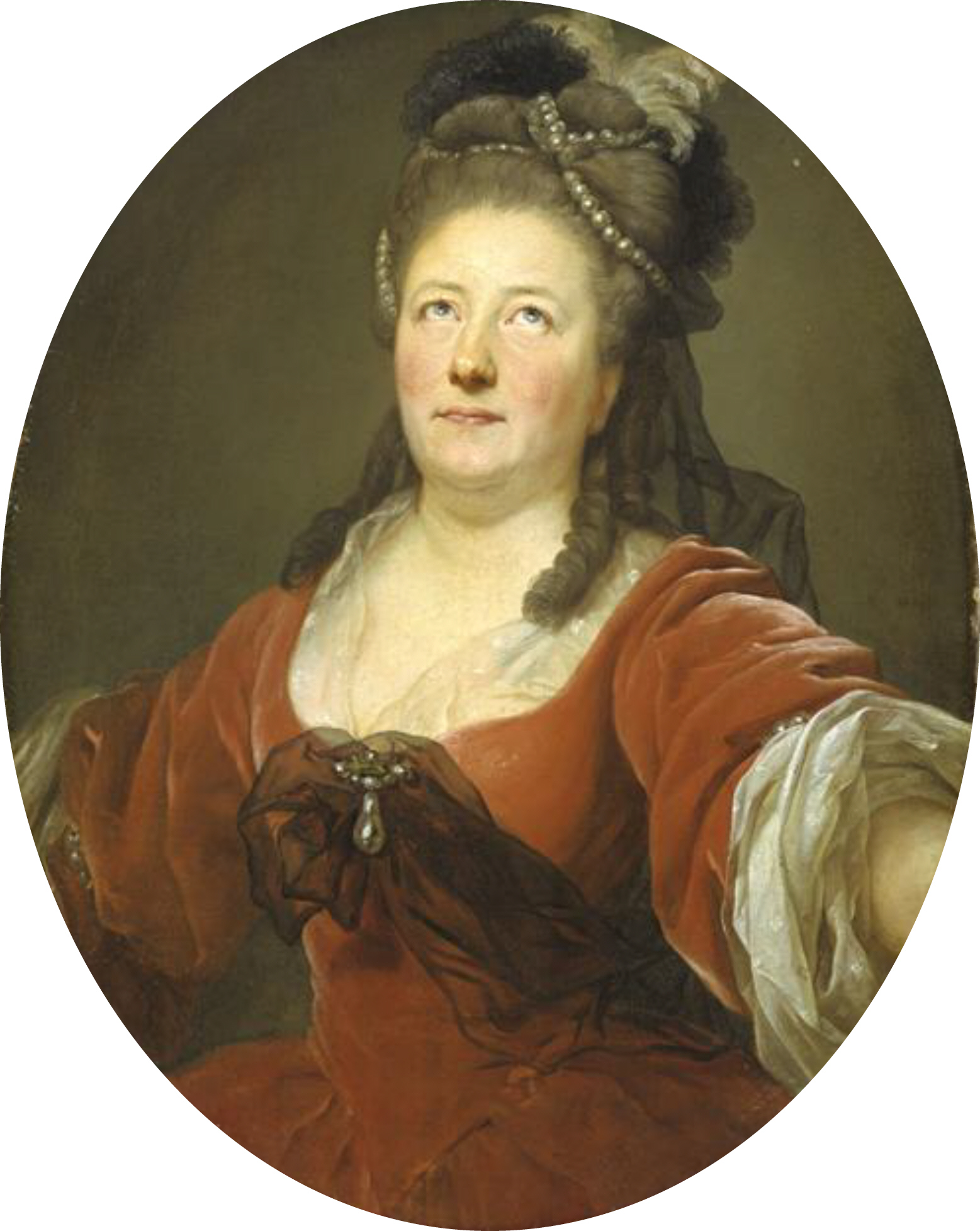
Friederike Sophie Seyler (formerly Hensel)

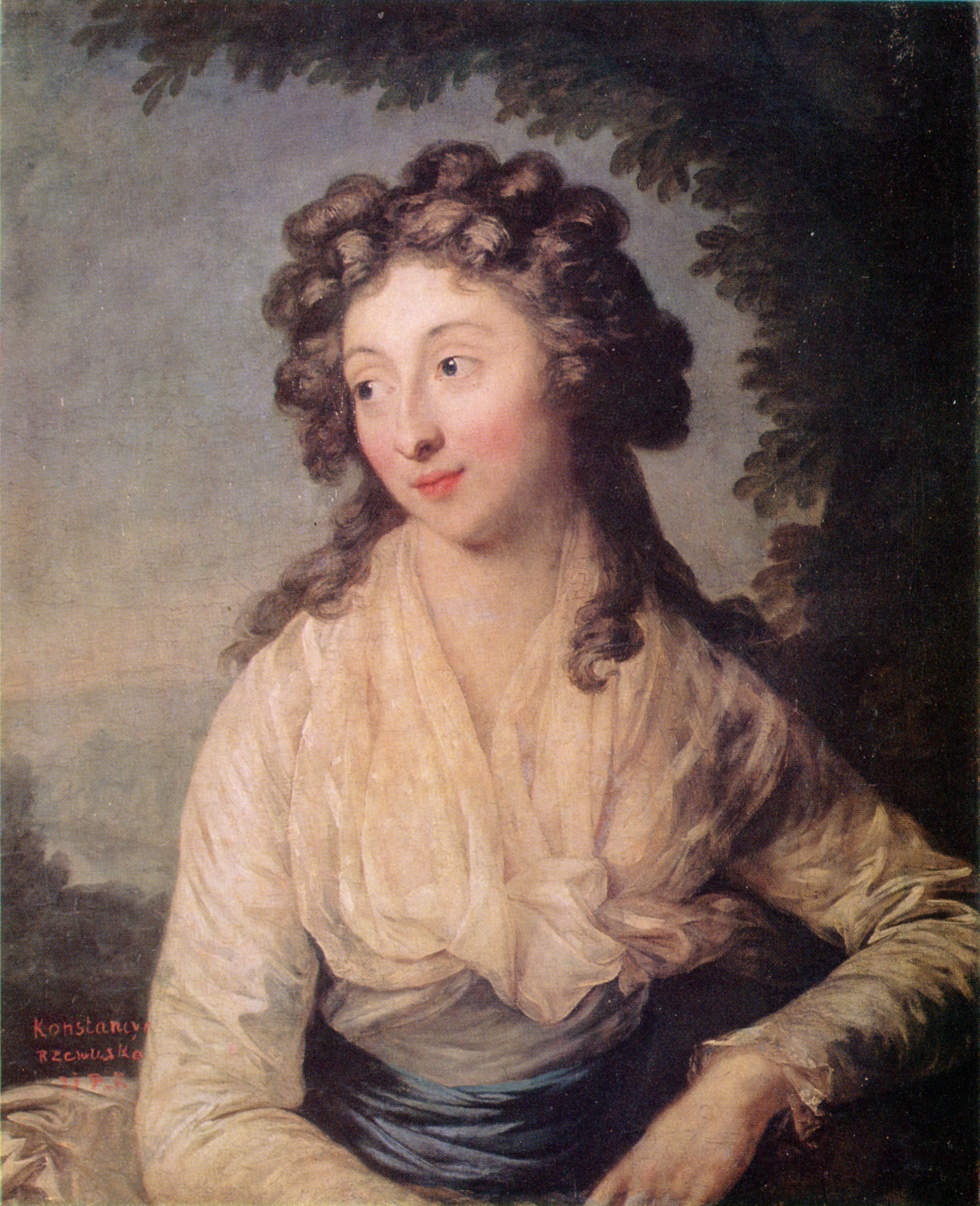
Portrait Konstancja Rzewuska (1789). This painting is in the Lviv National Art Gallery

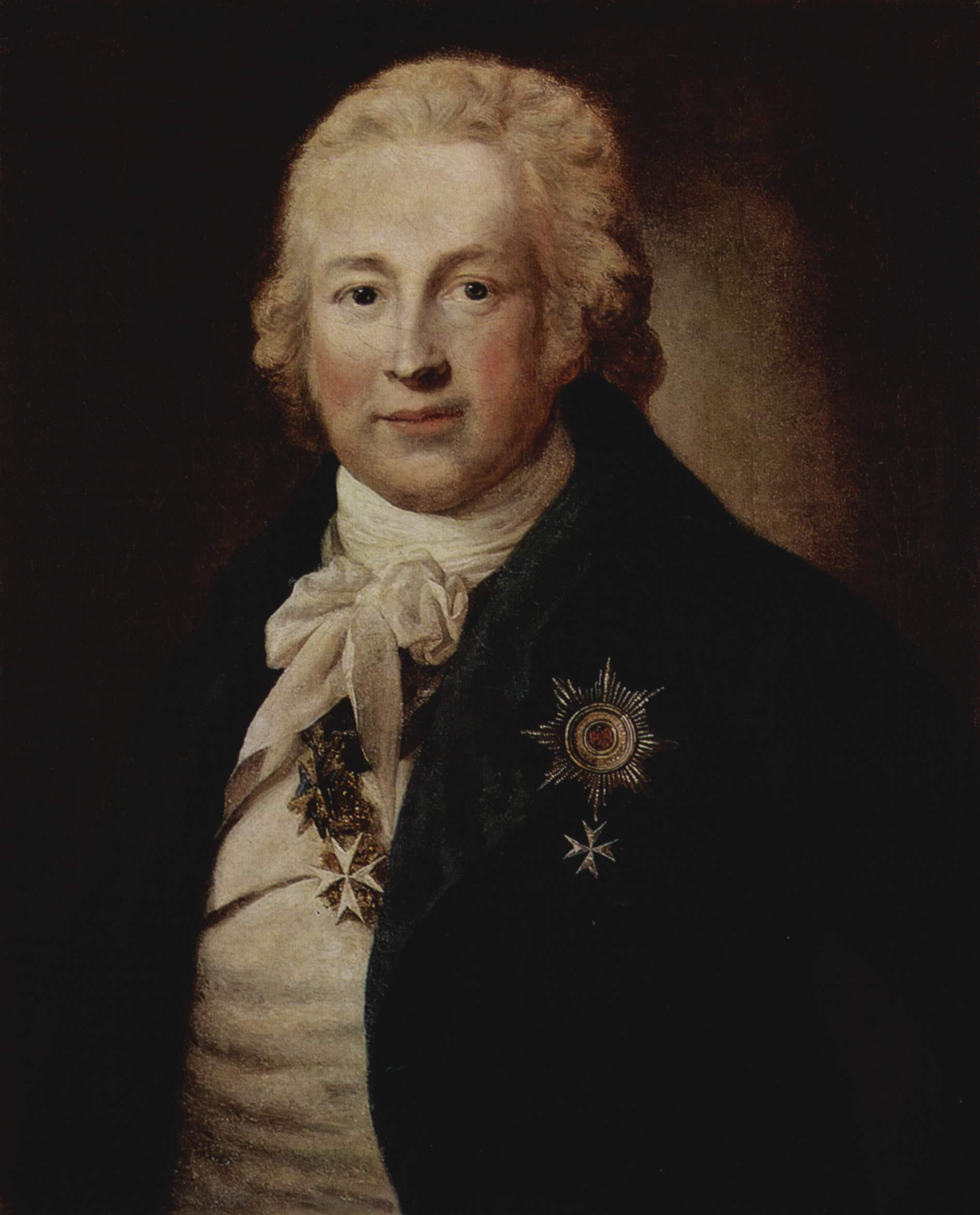
Christoph Johan Graf von Medem (1796)

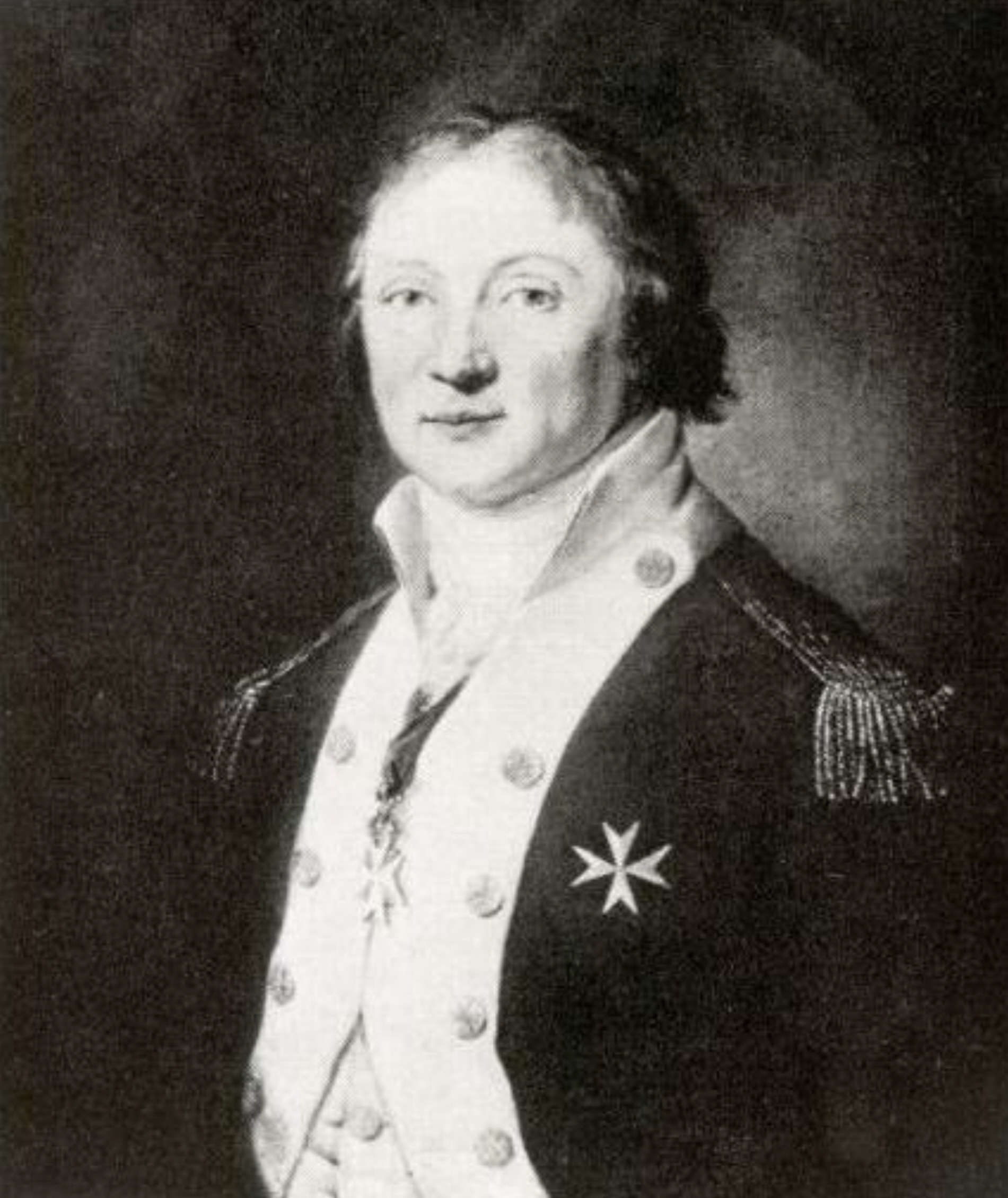
Christian Ludwig von Kaphengst
