= Johann Georg Sulzer =

German philosopher and mathematician (1720–1779)

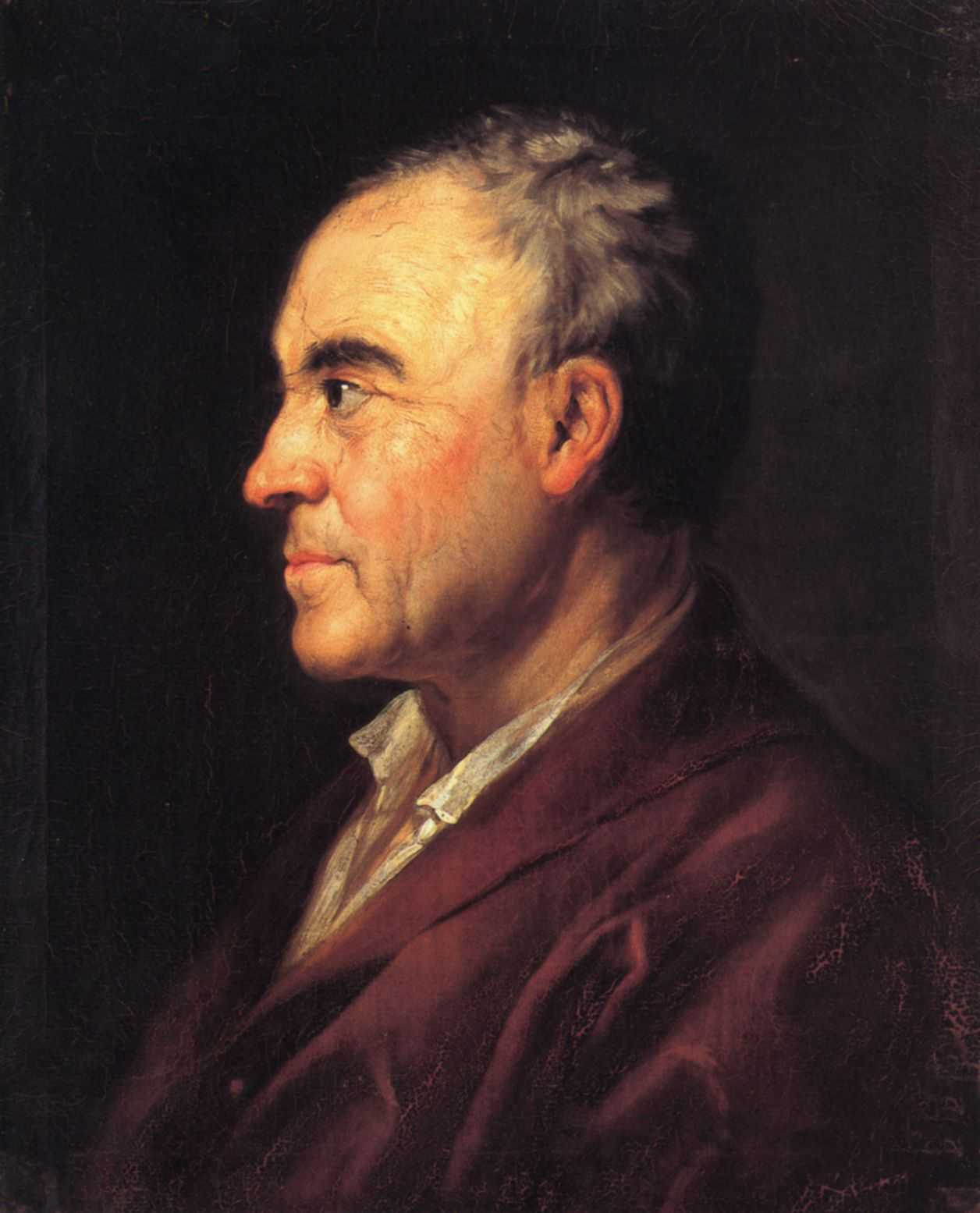
Portrait by Anton Graff, 1774

Johann Georg Sulzer (German: [ˈzʊltsər]; 16 October 1720 in Winterthur – 27 February 1779 in Berlin) was a Swiss professor of Mathematics, who later on moved on to the field of electricity. He was a Wolffian philosopher and director of the philosophical section of the Berlin Academy of Sciences, and translator of David Hume's An Enquiry Concerning the Principles of Morals into German in 1755.

== Anticipating galvanism ==
Sulzer is best known as the subject of an anecdote in the history of the development of the battery. In 1752, Sulzer happened to put the tip of his tongue between pieces of two different metals whose edges were in contact. He thought the metals set up a vibratory motion in their particles which excited the nerves of taste.

Si l'on joint deux pièces, une de plomb, & l'autre d'argent, de forte que les deux bords fassent un même plan, & qu'on les approche fur la langue on en sentira quelque goût, assez approchant au goût du Vitriol de fer, pendant que chaque pièce à part ne donne aucune trace de ce goût. Il n’est pas probable, que par cette jonction des deux metaux, il arrive quelque solution de l’un ou de l’autre, & que les particules dissuotes s’insinuent dans la langue. Il faut donc conclurre, que la jonction de ces métaux opère dans l’un ou l’autre, ou dans tous les deux, une vibration dans leurs particules, & que cette vibration, qui doit nécessairement affecter les nerfs de la langue, y produise le goût mentionné.

—“Recherches sur l'origine des sentimens agréables et désagréables: Troisième partie. Des plaisirs des sens”
Translation:

If we join two pieces, one of lead, and the other of silver, so that the two edges join, and if we approach them with the tongue we will feel some taste, quite similar to the taste of vitriol of iron [iron(II) sulfate], while each piece apart gives no trace of this taste. It is not probable that through this junction of the two metals, any solution of one or the other occurs, and that the dissolved particles penetrate the tongue. We must therefore conclude that the junction of these metals produces in one or the other, or in both, a vibration in their particles, and that this vibration, which must necessarily affect the nerves of the tongue, produces there the taste mentioned.

The event became known as the "battery tongue test": the saliva serves as the electrolyte carrying the current between two metallic electrodes.

== General Theory of the Fine Arts ==
His General Theory of the Fine Arts has been called "probably the most influential aesthetic compendium of the closing years of the eighteenth century". It was published in three volumes with the first volume published in 1771, and the second and last volume published three years later in 1774. It was the first encyclopedia in German that aimed to systematize all findings regarding aesthetics in which he "extended Baumgarten's approach into an even more psychological theory that the primary object of enjoyment in aesthetic experience is the state of one's own cognitive condition." It was modelled on French encyclopaedias, such as Denis Diderot's universal encyclopaedia, the Encyclopédie ou Dictionnaire raisonné des sciences, des arts et des métiers.

In around 900 articles, Sulzer deals in detail with basic concepts and individual questions of aesthetics and deals with the areas of literature, rhetoric, visual arts, architecture, dance, music, and acting. In doing so, he made use of philosophical and aesthetic works by Bodmer, Breitinger, Karl Wilhelm Ramler and Johann Adolf Schlegel, among others. Thus, the monumental work presents the state of knowledge of the German High Enlightenment in a condensed form and is one of the most important lexical publications in the Age of Enlightenment.

Sulzer rates the Ode as the highest type of poetry. In addition to Klopstock's Messiah, he also counts Bodmer's Noah among the masterpieces of German poetry and sees the importance of Plautus and Molière above all in their serious plays.

However, with Sulzer's metaphysical hopes, Kant had respectfully disagreed. Kant wrote: "I cannot share the opinion so frequently expressed by excellent and thoughtful men (for instance Sulzer) who, being fully conscious of the weakness of the proofs hitherto advanced, indulge in a hope that the future would supply us with evident demonstrations of the two cardinal propositions of pure reason, namely, that there is a God, and that there is a future life. I am certain, on the contrary, that this will never be the case...."

== Bibliography ==
- Unterredungen über die Schönheit der Natur (1750)
- Gedanken über den Ursprung der Wissenschaften und schönen Künste (1762)
- Allgemeine Theorie der schönen Künste (1771–74)
- Vermischte philosophische Schriften (1773/81)
