= Karl Ludwig Kaaz =

German painter

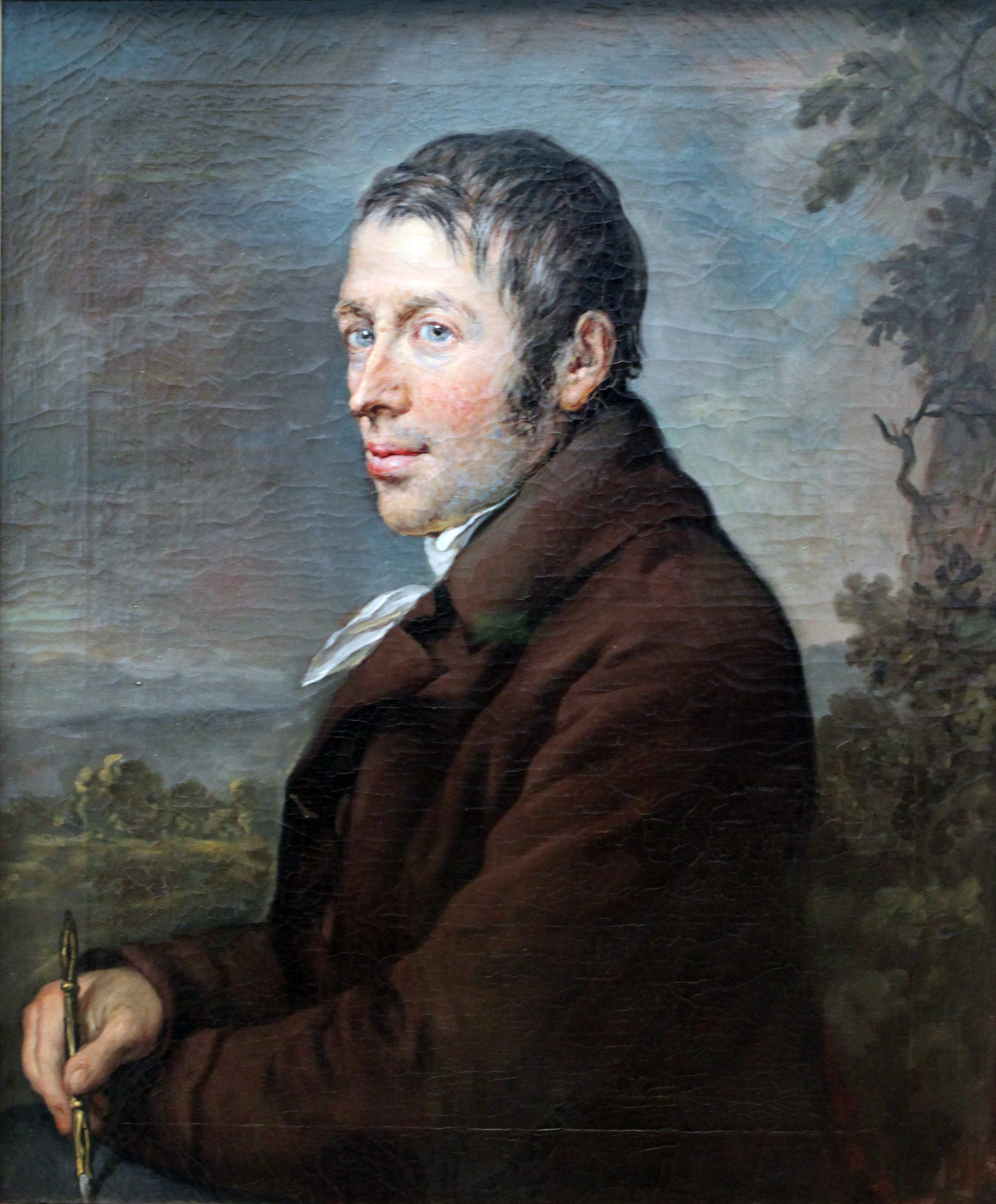
Karl Ludwig Kaaz; portrait by Anton Graff (1809)

Karl Ludwig Kaaz, or Katz (22 January 1773 – 14 July 1810) was a German painter, known primarily for his landscapes.

== Biography ==
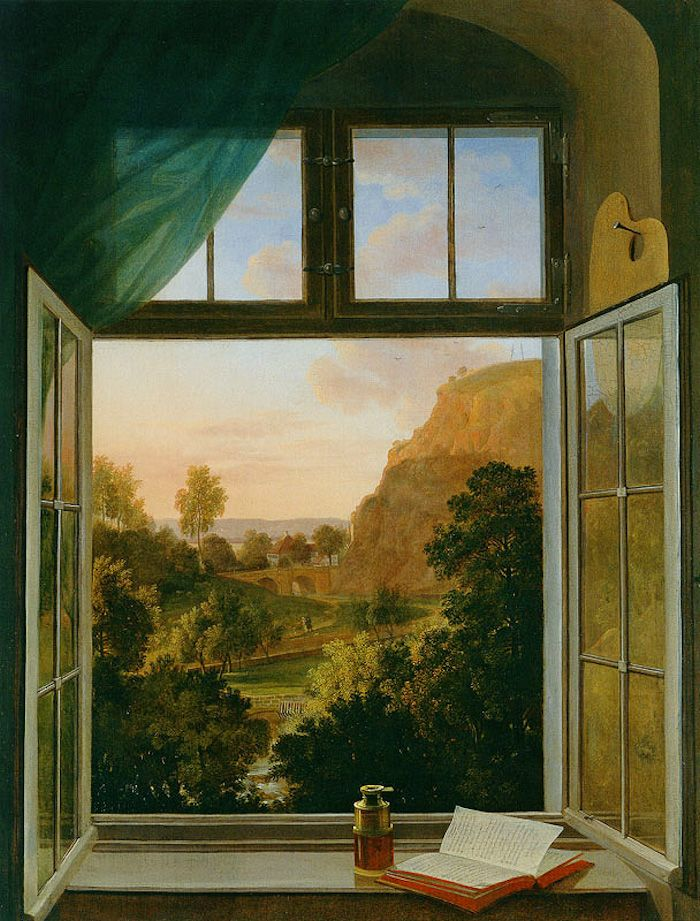
View of the Plauenscher Grund from the Villa Grassi

He was born in Karlsruhe. His father, Georg Jakob Katz (1723–1775), was a tax collector. After his mother's death in 1784, he was placed in an orphanage in Pforzheim. He was initially apprenticed as a scribe, then as a bookbinder. In 1792, he moved to La Chaux-de-Fonds, in Switzerland, where his sister was married to a goldsmith. There, he learned copperplate engraving and miniature painting. After a short term at the State Academy of Fine Arts Stuttgart, he transferred to the Dresden Academy of Fine Arts, where he studied with Johann Christian Klengel and Jacob Wilhelm Mechau.

In Dresden, he made connections with many notable families, including that of the painter Anton Graff, who was also one of his teachers, and he gained a major patron in the poet, Elisa von der Recke. Her support enabled him to accompany Traugott Leberecht Pochmann and Graff's son, the landscape painter, Carl Anton Graff, on a study trip to Paris and Italy. Their trip lasted from 1801 to 1804, and he came home with notebooks full of sketches.

Over the course of the next few years, the sketches were turned into gouaches, watercolors and washes. In 1805, he used a sketch of Lake Nemi to create a large fresco at Schloss Frohburg. That same year, he married Graff's daughter, Caroline Susanne. Two years later, he was presented with a major prize from the Stuttgart Academy. He also began taking students of his own, including Ferdinand Olivier.

Kaaz became acquainted with Goethe in 1805. Three years later, they worked together at Karlsbad, where they had both come to the spa to take "the cure". In 1809, when Kaaz was in Weimar to give drawing lessons at the court, he stayed at Goethe's home, then spent a few weeks with him in Jena. He was also acquainted with Schiller and created a painting for his drama William Tell, called "I am Liberated".

He remained active, despite several years of worsening health, and died, aged only thirty-seven, in Dresden while working at his easel. His two daughters were given into the care of the Graff family.

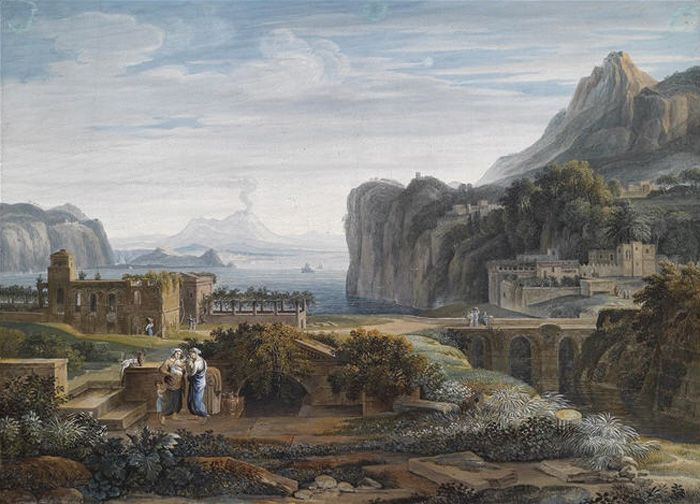
An Idealized Landscape of Ischia
