= Bernhard Vogel (engraver) =

German engraver

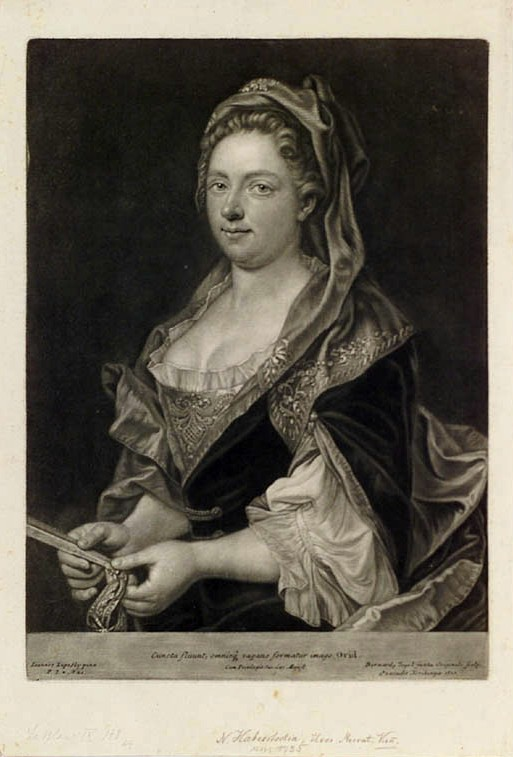
"Female Portrait", after Jan Kupecký (1667-1740), mezzotint by Bernhard Vogel

Bernhard Vogel (19 December 1683 – 13 October 1737) was a German engraver whose main interests were genre scenes and portraits.

Vogel was born in Nürnberg. He studied under Weigel and Heisse in Augsburg.

In 1745 a number of his engravings after Jan Kupecký were published by the German painter and engraver Valentin Daniel Preissler.

He died in Augsburg, aged 53.
