= Jan Kupecký =

Czech painter (1667–1740)

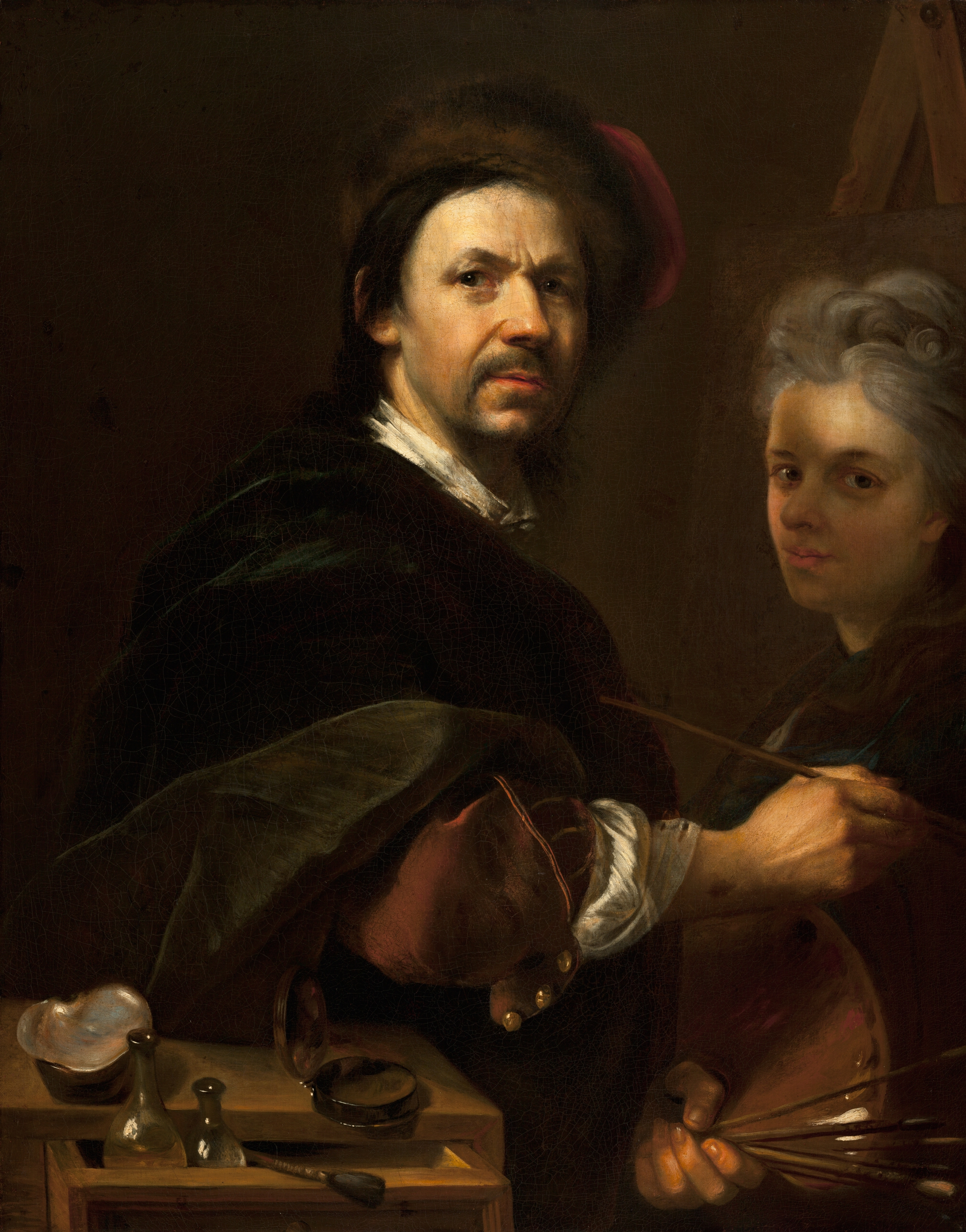
Self-portrait in 1711

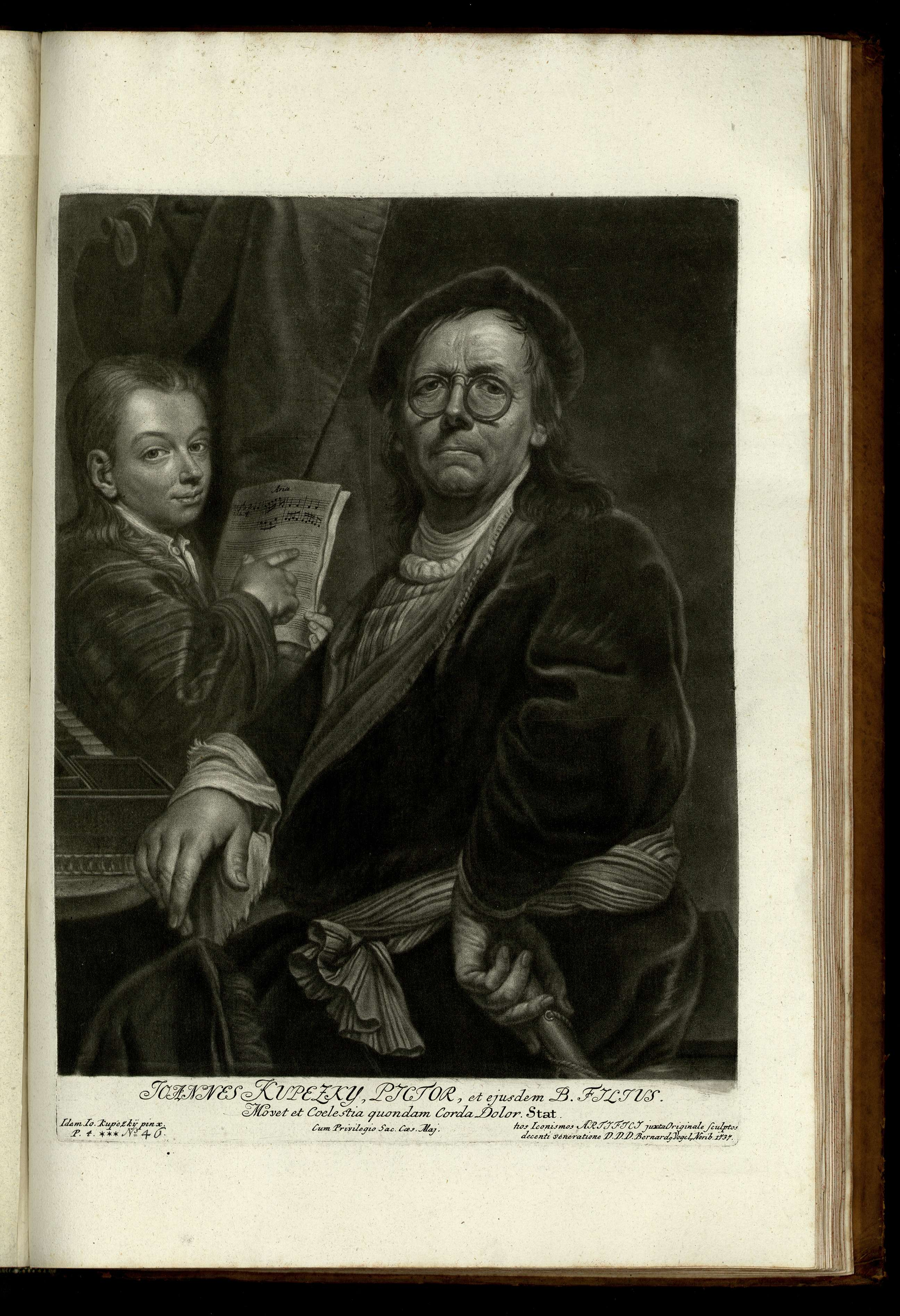
Jan Kupecký and his son by Bernhard Vogel

Jan Kupecký (Slovak: Ján Kupecký, German: Johann Kupetzky, Hungarian: Kupecky/Kupeczky János; 1667 – 16 July 1740) was a Czech portrait painter during the Baroque era. He was active in Hungary, Vienna and Nuremberg. Bernhard Vogel produced many engravings after Kupecký's paintings.

== Life ==
Kupecký, like many people at that time, was the son of Protestant (Czech Brethren) parents from Mladá Boleslav in Bohemia who sought refuge in Royal Hungary from religious persecution by the Catholics. He was born in Pezinok – a town near Pressburg.

According to the sources he began his studies with the Swiss painter Benedikt Klaus, who was active in both Vienna and in Royal Hungary. At the age of twenty, Kupecký went on a long Italian study trip. In Rome Prince Aleksander Benedykt Sobieski, the son of the Polish king John III Sobieski, helped him to become famous. He returned to Vienna in 1709, after twenty-two years spent in Venice and Rome. We know little of his Italian activity as well as his early works and his setting in Vienna.

According to his contemporary biographer, the Swiss Johann Caspar Füssli, the Protestant Kupecký, who faithfully clung to his ancestor's religion, remained withdrawn and isolated in Vienna's Catholic milieu, which was under the influence of the court and the aristocracy. However this concept is partly contradicted by the fact that the master had significant courtly commissions while working in Vienna. He painted portraits of various members of the dynasty, Prince Eugene of Savoy, several aristocrats, and, in Karlovy Vary, even of the Russian Czar Peter I. The rich oeuvre of this period comprises a series of gorgeous portraits of Kupecky's family, friends and the painter himself, as well as several persons whose identity in unknown.

In 1733 Kupecký, fearing religious persecution, fled from Vienna to Nuremberg with his family and worked there until his death in 1740. As the most significant portrait painter of contemporary Germany, he was commissioned by many German princes, church dignitaries, rich merchants and scholars, and his works were popularized by engravings even during his lifetime. Through his pupils and followers Kupecký's influence and artistic example remained alive and widespread for a long time.

== Work ==
His inspirations were Caravaggio, Reni and Rembrandt.

His paintings include:

- Portrait of Peter I of Russia
- Portrait of Alexei Petrovich, Tsarevich of Russia
- Portrait of Matej Bel
- Kuruc fighter

and many other paintings

The City Gallery of Bratislava owns the most complete collection of graphic leaves of his paintings.

== Bibliography ==
- (in German) Safarik, Eduard A.: Johann Kupezky - Ein Meister des Barockportraits (Exhibition catalogue) 2002.
- Kořán, Ivo (2003). "Kupecký [Kopetzki; Kupeczky; Kupetzky; Kupezzky], Jan". Grove Art Online.
