= Paul Henri Balluet d'Estournelles de Constant =

French politician (1852 - 1924)

Paul d'Estournelles de Constant
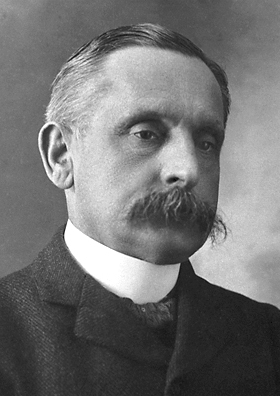

Personal details
- Born: Paul Henri Benjamin Balluet d'Estournelles de Constant de Rebecque; 22 November 1852 La Flèche, France
- Died: 15 May 1924 (aged 71) Paris, France
- Occupation: Diplomat
- Awards: 1909 Nobel Peace Prize

Paul Henri Benjamin Balluet d'Estournelles de Constant, Baron de Constant de Rebecque (French: [pɔl destuʁnɛl də kɔ̃stɑ̃]; 22 November 1852 – 15 May 1924), was a French diplomat and politician, advocate of international arbitration and winner of the 1909 Nobel Peace Prize.

== Biography ==
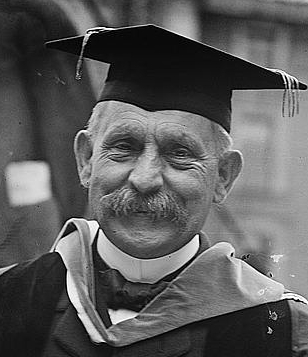
Paul d'Estournelles de Constant

He was born at La Flèche (Sarthe) in the Loir valley to the Constant de Rebecque family; the renowned Revolution-era writer and politician Benjamin Constant was his great-uncle. After studying law and Oriental languages at the Lycée Louis-le-Grand in Paris, Estournelles de Constant embarked on a diplomatic career in 1876.

Among Estournelles de Constant's early diplomatic posts were Montenegro, the Ottoman Empire, the Netherlands, Great Britain, and Tunisia; in 1882 he returned to Paris to serve as assistant director of the Levant bureau of the Ministry of Foreign Affairs. In 1890 he was posted to London as the French chargé d'affaires, where he played a role in averting war with Britain over colonial disputes. Frustrated by the limitations of diplomatic service, he ran for parliament in 1895, securing a seat in the Chamber of Deputies. In 1904 Estournelles de Constant ran for and won a seat in the Senate, where he served until the end of his career in 1924.

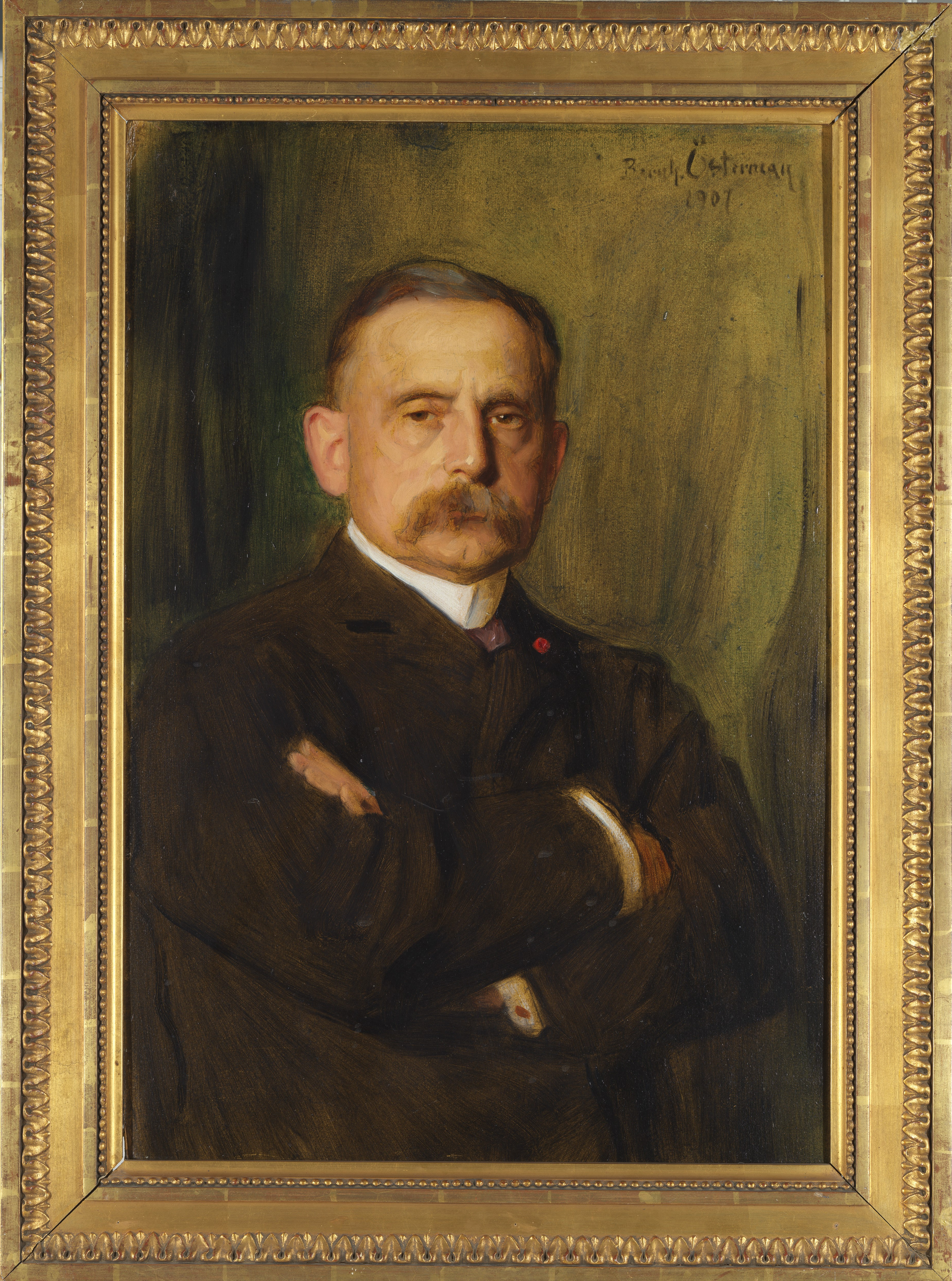
Portrait by Bernhard Österman, 1907

As a deputy and senator, Estournelles de Constant concerned himself with colonial issues, consistently opposing Third Republic colonial policy. He advocated the elimination of colonial seats in the French parliament, preferring a policy of establishing protectorates to the traditional republican programme of colonial assimilation. In particular, he vehemently opposed the establishment of French colonial rule in Madagascar and the Great Powers' dismemberment of China. In domestic affairs, he was concerned particularly with what the terminology of the day called "outrages against morality" (outrages aux bonnes mœurs). He was a Dreyfusard and argued in favour of placing Émile Zola's remains in the Panthéon for Zola's part in the Dreyfus Affair.

Above all, though, Estournelles de Constant dedicated himself to the cause of improving international relations, and he was a member of the Permanent Court of Arbitration from 1900. He represented France at both Hague Peace Conferences (1898 and 1907), and outlined a vision of a European union.

Estournelles de Constant wrote historical and political works and even dabbled in playwriting. In addition, he was a regular contributor to the newspapers Le Temps, La Revue de Paris, and La Revue des deux mondes. Married to an American, Daisy Sedgwick Berend, he also travelled extensively in and wrote about the United States.

Estournelles de Constant's name may be encountered in numerous variants; the article title reflects the form standardized by the Bibliothèque nationale de France.

From 1904, and more officially from 1905, Paul d'Estournelles de Constant chaired the Association de Conciliation Internationale, with which he tried to influence international policies towards arbitration, disarmament and peace16.

Estournelles de Constant was elected an International Member of the American Philosophical Society in 1907.

In 1899, then in 1907, Paul d'Estournelles de Constant represented France, with Léon Bourgeois and Louis Renault, at the Hague Conferences. Their aim was to work for the peaceful settlement of international conflicts by promoting mediation, and especially international arbitration. He helped Léon Bollée, the main supporter of the American Wilbur Wright, an aviation pioneer, in his aeronautical experiments carried out between August 8, 1908 and January 2, 1909, at Le Mans and in Sarthe, first at the Hunaudières racecourse and later at the Auvours military camp.

Paul d'Estournelles de Constant receives the Nobel Peace Prize on December 10, 1909, jointly with the Belgian deputy Auguste Beernaert, for their efforts in the construction of international law, in particular in the organization of the conferences of The Hague of 1899 and 1907 which lead to the creation of a Permanent Court of Arbitration17. He was the third Frenchman to receive this distinction after Frédéric Passy, in 1901, and Louis Renault, in 1907. The news of this appointment had little echo in the national press, because only the newspaper La Croix announced it on the front page. 17.

== Posterity ==
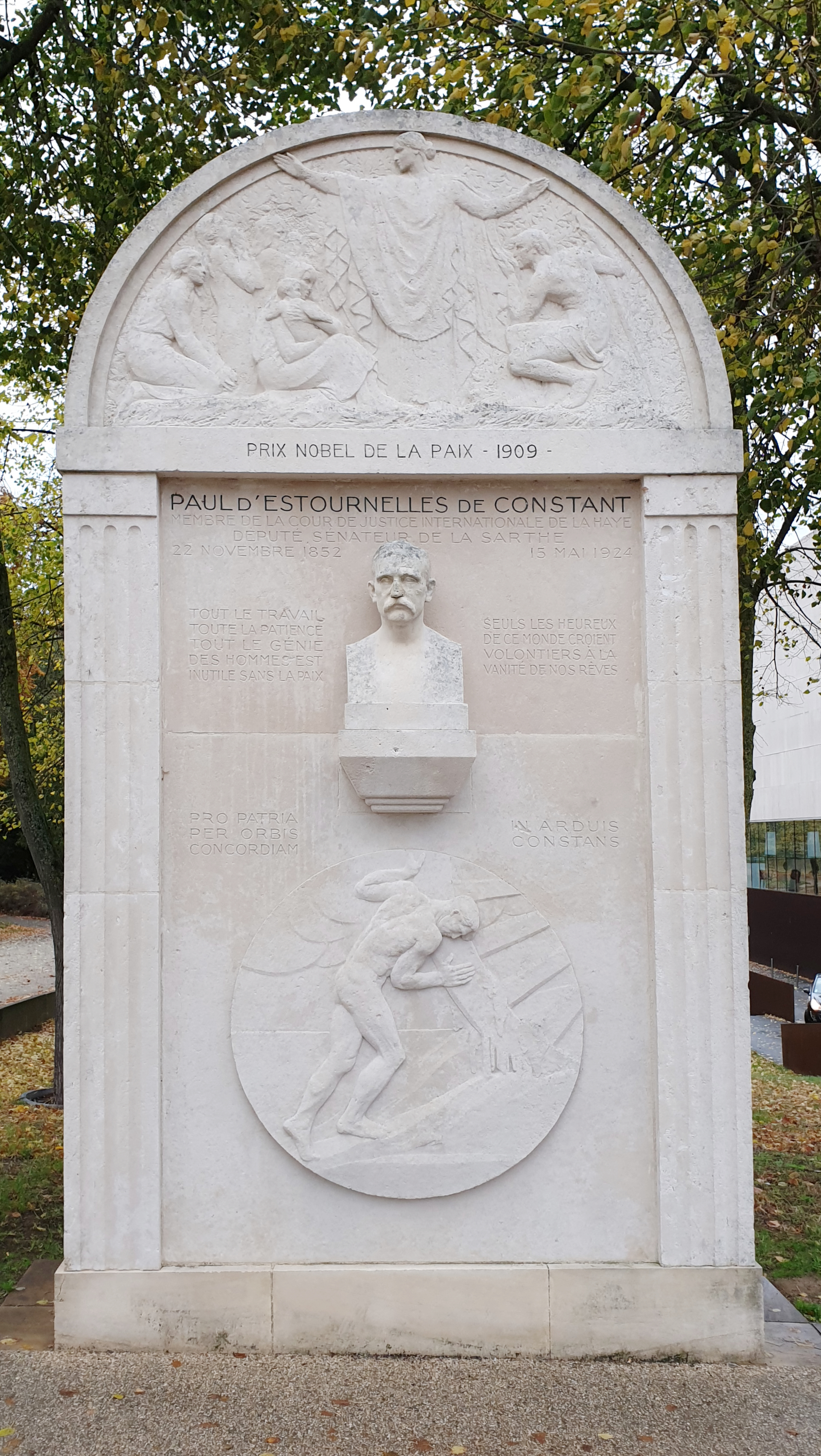
Paul d'Estournelles de Constant bust, by Paul Landowski, Place des Jacobins (Jacobins square), in Le Mans, Sarthe, France.

In La Flèche (Sarthe), his hometown, two schools bear his name: the Estournelles de Constant General and Technological High School, and the Estournelles de Constant Kindergarten.

An amphitheatre bears his name at the UFR (Training and Research Unit) of Law, Economic Sciences and Management of the University of Maine (Université du Maine).

A monument, including a bust by Paul Landowski, also pays tribute to him on the “Place des Jacobins” (Jacobins Square), at Le Mans (coordinates: 48.0083791°N 0.1999867°E).

== Sources ==
- Jolly, Jean, dir. Dictionnaire des parlementaires français: Notices biographiques sur les ministres, députés et sénateurs français de 1889 à 1940. 6 vols. Paris: Presses universitaires de France, 1960–70.
- "Paul Henri d'Estournelles de Constant—Biography".
