= Samuel Constant de Rebecque =

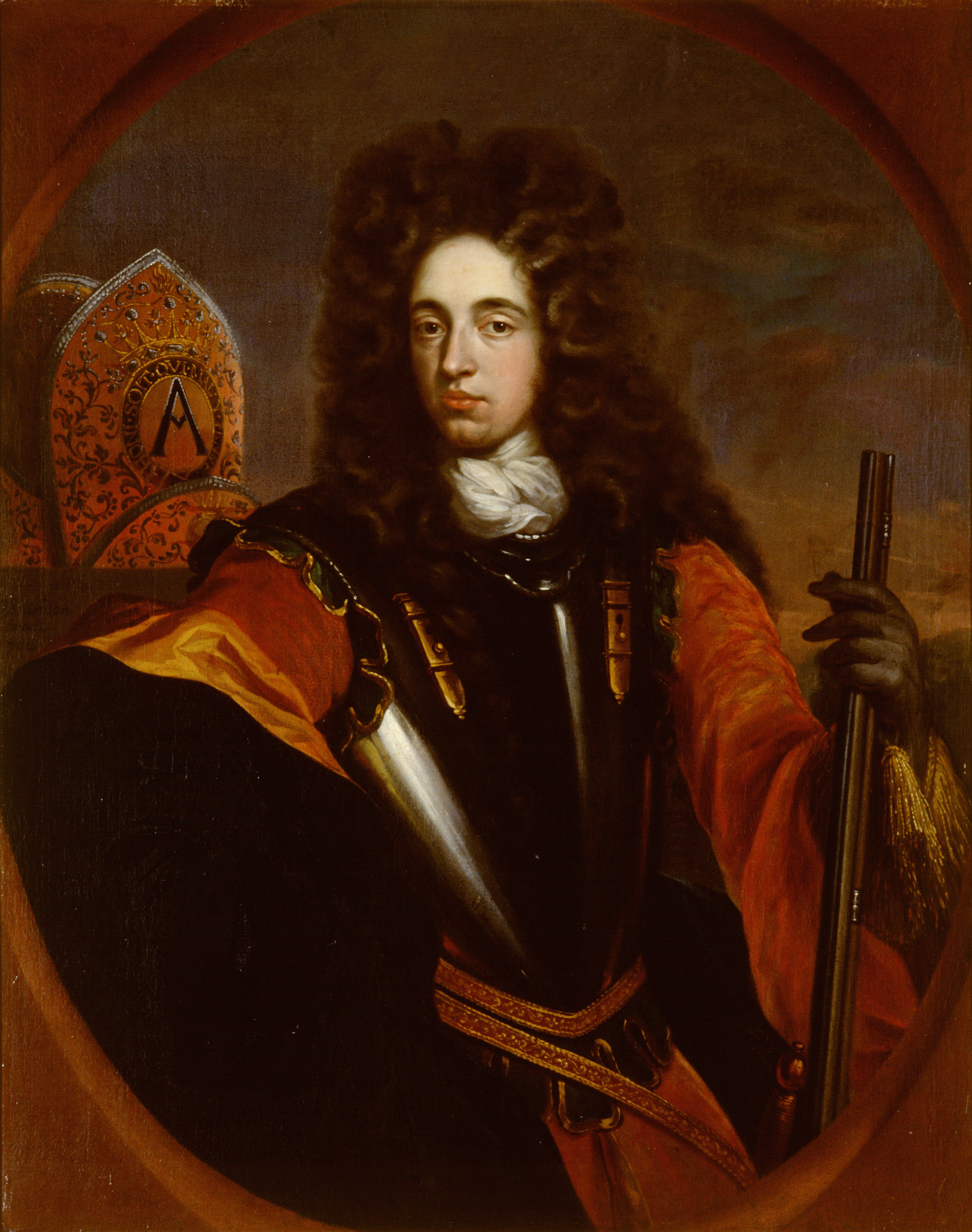
Portrait by Jan Hendrik Brandon, 1702

Samuel (de) Constant, marquis de Rebecque (26 November 1676 – 6 January 1756) was Swiss mercenary in the service of the Dutch States Army.

== Life ==
Constant de Rebecque was born in Lausanne on 26 November 1676 to David Constant de Rebecque, the principal of the Academy of Lausanne, and Marie Colladon. He belonged to the Constant de Rebecque noble family, which originally came from Rebecques in French Flanders before fleeing to Switzerland during the French Wars of Religion.

Constant de Rebecque studied Calvinist theology in Lausanne, Zurich, and Geneva. From 1699, he served as an officer in the army of the Republic of the Seven United Netherlands, where he expanded a Swiss regiment. During the War of the Spanish Succession, Constant de Rebecque took part in the Battle of Ekeren, in 1703, and at the Battle of Ramillies in 1706, where he helped to save the life of the Duke of Marlborough. He became an aide-de-camp to Arnold van Keppel, 1st Earl of Albemarle in 1708. Constant de Rebecque was also present at the Battle of Oudenaarde in 1708, the Battle of Malplaquet in 1709, and several major sieges of the time, earning the great esteem of both Marlborough and Prince Eugene of Savoy. In 1712, he was promoted to major.

In 1721, Constant de Rebecque married Rose-Susanne de Saussure from Lausanne. He was promoted to colonel in 1727, to major general in 1742, and finally to lieutenant general in 1747. Constant de Rebecque acquired estates and noble titles in Switzerland. In 1725, he became Lord of Hermenches and Baron of Rebecque; in 1753, he became Lord of Villars-Mendraz. Constat de Rebecque served as governor of Sluis (1746–1748) and 's-Hertogenbosch (1748–1756) in his later years. He died in Lausanne on 6 January 1756.

His son, David-Louis Constant de Rebecque, became his orderly officer and followed him in a military career in the service of the Dutch Republic. Botanical illustrator Rosalie de Constant was his granddaughter.

== Sources ==
- Aa, Abraham Jacob van der (1858). "Samuel Baron de Constant-Rebecque". Biographisch woordenboek der Nederlanden. Deel 3.
