= Constant de Rebecque =

European noble house

House of Constant Rebecque
- Original arms of the House of Constant
- Country: France, Normandy, Switzerland, The Netherlands, Sweden, Hebron
- Founded: 886
- Titles: Marquis of Rebecque; Lord of Hebron; Baron Constant; Baron of Clercy; Baron of Clarcque; Lord of Hermanches; Lord of Flon; Lord of Villars; Lord of Mendras
- Motto: In arduis constans ("prosperous through hardship" or "steadfast in adversity")

Constant de Rebecque is an ancient noble family which participated in the crusades. It claims origin from Aire, in Normandy, and what is today Picardy. It takes its name from Rebecques in Artois, which the family claimed as a barony. This was confirmed as late as 1213 by letters patent.

Having converted to Protestantism and sided with Henri IV (providing several high-ranking officers during the French Wars of Religion), the surviving members fled France for the Switzerland after the religious purge that followed.

Family tradition dictated that senior members of the house served as officers in the French Royal Lifeguard, the Cent Suisses, with the last one being Jean Victor de Constant Rebecque.

Since its emigration to Switzerland, the family has branched out and been naturalised in many other European countries, including Sweden, Norway, the Netherlands, and possibly Ireland.

Through its many branches, the house belongs to the Dutch nobility, the Swedish nobility, and the peerage of Ireland..

Members of the family hold the Dutch title of baron and the customary styling of French marquis.

Following the French Revolution and the Insurrection of 10 August 1792, Jean Victor Constant de Rebecque pledged allegiance to the Netherlands and became chief of staff for the Dutch forces at the Battle of Waterloo.

In modern times, members style themselves "Constant de Rebecque", "d'Estournelles de Constant", "de Constant", "de Constant de Flon", or simply "Constant".

== Members ==
- Benjamin Constant
- Jean Victor de Constant Rebecque
- David-Louis Constant de Rebecque
- Jean d'Estournelles de Constant
- Paul-Henri-Benjamin d'Estournelles de Constant
- Samuel Constant de Rebecque
- Jean Constant de Flon

== See also ==
- Adlercrona
- de Constant Rebecque
