= Albert Dominicus Trip van Zoudtlandt =

Jonkheer Albert Dominicus Trip van Zoudtlandt
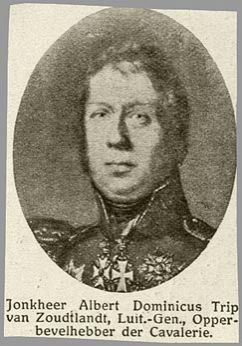
- General van Zoudtlandt.
- Born: 13 October 1776; Groningen, Netherlands
- Died: 23 March 1835 (aged 58); The Hague, Netherlands
- Military career
- Allegiance: Dutch Republic; Batavian Republic; First French Empire; United Kingdom of the Netherlands
- Branch: Army
- Service years: 1791-1835
- Rank: Lieutenant-General
- Commands: Commander-in-Chief of the Dutch Cavalry
- Conflicts: French Revolutionary Wars; Napoleonic Wars; French invasion of Russia; Battle of the Berezina; War of the Sixth Coalition; Battle of Leipzig; Hundred Days; Battle of Quatre Bras; Battle of Waterloo; Belgian Revolution; Ten days' campaign
- Awards: Knight-Commander of the Military Order of William; Grand-Cross of the Order of the Netherlands Lion

Jonkheer Albert Dominicus Trip van Zoudtlandt (Groningen, 13 October 1776—The Hague, 23 March 1835) was a Dutch lieutenant-general of cavalry who headed the Dutch heavy cavalry brigade at the Battle of Waterloo.

== Biography ==
=== Family life ===
Trip was the son of Jonkheer Jan Louis Trip van Zoudtlandt and Anna Wilhelmina, countess of Limburg-Stirum. He first married Cornelia Gijsberta Smit, and after her death, Elisabeth Gratiana, countess of Limburg-Stirum (a cousin) at The Hague on 16 August 1826.

=== Career ===
Trip entered the service of the Dutch Republic on 1 July 1791 as a cadet in an infantry regiment. He was commissioned as a second lieutenant in 1792, and promoted to first lieutenant on 8 July 1795. By then the Batavian Republic had replaced the Dutch Republic. As an officer in the Batavian army, and subsequently the army of the Kingdom of Holland he saw action in its campaigns as an ally of the imperial French army in Germany and (then Swedish) Pomerania. During this career he switched to the cavalry and became commander of a regiment of cuirassiers.

When the Kingdom of Holland was annexed by the First French Empire in July 1810, all Dutch army units were incorporated in the French army under new names. Trip's regiment became the 14th Regiment Cuirassiers. With this regiment Trip took part in the French invasion of Russia in 1812. His regiment distinguished itself (like other Dutch regiments) at the Battle of Berezina, during the harrowing retreat of the French army from Moscow.

Trip subsequently took part in the final campaigns of the French army before Napoleon I of France's first abdication in 1814. He distinguished himself again at the Battle of Leipzig. After the fall of the Empire the Dutch contingents in the French army were demobilized. Trip left French service as a colonel on 14 April 1814. He entered the service of the new Dutch army (the Netherlands having regained its independence at the end of 1813) in June 1814 with the same rank, and became aide de camp of the Sovereign Prince, William I of the Netherlands. He was promoted to major-general on 16 April 1815 and given the command of a brigade of heavy cavalry, composed of the 1st and 3rd (Dutch) and 2nd (Belgian) regiments of (mounted) carabiniers of the new Netherlands Mobile Army of the United Kingdom of the Netherlands.

=== Battles of Quatre Bras and Waterloo ===
This brigade took part in the Battle of Quatre Bras and the subsequent Battle of Waterloo as part of the Netherlands Cavalry Division (lt.-gen. J.A. Baron de Collaert) of the First Netherlands Corps under the Prince of Orange. This Corps formed the center of the Duke of Wellington's Anglo-Allied army at Waterloo. Trip's brigade was initially placed astride the Nivelles road, but when Trip noticed the French preparations for Marshal Ney's great cavalry attack after d'Erlon's failed assault on the Allied left wing, he repositioned his brigade to counter that attack to a position south-west of Mont St.-Jean. When Ney attacked the British artillery Trip's brigade joined Lord Edward Somerset's Household Brigade in its counterattack. Both the French cuirassiers and the Dutch/Belgian carabiniers charged. The French horses (already tired from their previous exertions) could not make sufficient speed, due to the heavy ground they had to traverse, and Trip's carabiniers shattered their formation through the sheer impact of their assault. This caused a rout of the left wing of the French cuirassiers, which was exploited by other allied cavalry units. During this encounter Trips's brigade suffered severe casualties.

Despite these casualties, the brigade soon had to renew its attacks. The 2nd (Belgian) Regiment was led by the Prince of Orange personally in a charge, where he encouraged them with the cry: 'Allons, mes camarades, sabrons ces Francais, la victoire est à nous' (Come on, comrades, let's put our sabres to these Frenchmen, the victory is ours). The brigade again routed the opposing cavalry and pursued them past the road to Ohain. During these exploits the commanders of both the 1st (lt.-col. Coenegracht) and 3rd (lt.-col. Lechleitner) regiments were mortally wounded. Nevertheless, the brigade took part in the pursuit of the French army after the failed attack of Napoleon's Guard divisions finally caused its defeat, until Wellington called off the pursuit around 10 pm.

Trip was mentioned in Wellington's dispatch of 19 June 1815 for the contribution his brigade had made to the Allied victory. Trip himself was made a knight-commander in the Military William Order on 8 July 1815.

=== The Siborne controversy ===
In 1844, almost thirty years after the battle, a British military historian, William Siborne, published a book based on a survey he had made of a number of British officers, who had attended the Battle of Waterloo. In this book Siborne accused Trip personally, and the brigade as a whole, of refusing to advance when ordered, on the basis of allegations made by Lord Uxbridge, the British cavalry commander at Waterloo, and Captain Horace Seymour. According to this account, Uxbridge had tried to order the brigade forward in a charge at the time Somerset made his charge. According to Uxbridge and Seymour, Trip had refused this order, even though Uxbridge had given him a severe reprimand (presumably in English). After Uxbridge had disgustedly ridden away (still to the testimony of the British eyewitnesses) the whole brigade had retired, even disturbing the preparations of other allied cavalry units. Uxbridge stated in his account that “I have the strongest reason to be excessively dissatisfied with the General commanding a Brigade of Dutch Heavy Cavalry, and with a Colonel commanding a young Regiment of Hanoverian Hussars.” Captain Horace Seymour also stated “as to the conduct of the Dutch Brigade of Heavy Cavalry, the impression still on my mind is that they did show a lamentable want of spirit,”.

This account is at variance with the above account of the battle, which is based on Dutch after-battle reports. Siborne has two eye-witness accounts. These allegations caused a furore in the Netherlands and Belgium. Dutch general Willem Jan Knoop soon published a semi-official refutation as did his Belgian colleague general Alexis-Michel Eenens. The latter is especially scathing in his destruction of Siborne's argument pertaining to the Trip brigade, probably because the honor of the 2nd (Belgian) regiment of carabiniers was directly insulted.

=== Later career ===
Trip was promoted to lieutenant-general of cavalry on 24 November 1816. He was appointed commander-in-chief of Dutch cavalry on 22 March 1831. During the Ten days campaign in the course of the Belgian Revolution of 1830 he was wounded during the attack on Leuven on 12 August 1831. Shortly afterward, he received the Grand-Cross in the Order of the Netherlands Lion.

Trip died, still in office, on 23 March 1835 in The Hague.

== Sources ==
- (in Dutch) Epen, D.G. van (1901) "Elisabeth Gratiana, gravin van Limburg Stirum", in: Adelsarchief: jaarboek van den nederlandschen adel. 1900-1904 (2e jaargang), pp. 201–202 (contains short biography of her husband, A.D. Trip van Zoudtlandt)
