= Saint-Augustin, Pas-de-Calais =

Saint-Augustin
- Commune
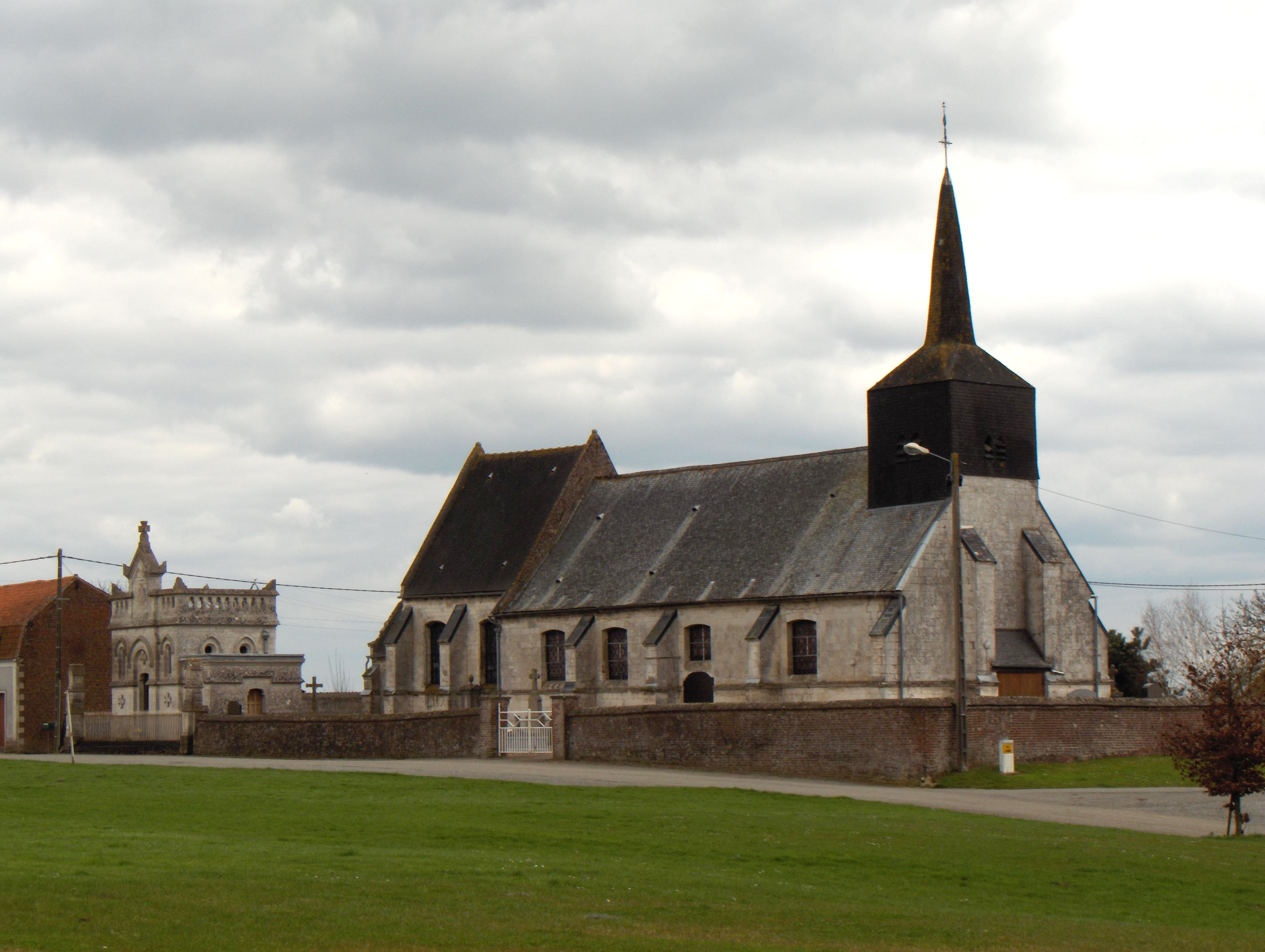
- The church of Clarques
- Location of Saint-Augustin
- Location within France Location within Hauts-de-France
- Coordinates: 50°38′42″N 2°18′18″E
- Country: France
- Region: Hauts-de-France
- Department: Pas-de-Calais
- Arrondissement: Saint-Omer
- Canton: Fruges
- Intercommunality: Pays de Saint-Omer

Government
  - Mayor (2020–2026): René Allouchery
- Area^{1}: 11.80 km^{2} (4.56 sq mi)
- Population (2023): 880
  - Density: 75/km^{2} (190/sq mi)
- Time zone: UTC+01:00 (CET)
  - Summer (DST): UTC+02:00 (CEST)
- INSEE/Postal code: 62691 /62120
- ^{1} French Land Register data, which excludes lakes, ponds, glaciers > 1 km^{2} (0.386 sq mi or 247 acres) and river estuaries.

Saint-Augustin (French pronunciation: [sɛ̃.t‿oɡystɛ̃]) is a commune in the Pas-de-Calais department of northern France. The municipality was established on 1 January 2016 and consists of the former communes of Clarques and Rebecques.

== See also ==
- Communes of the Pas-de-Calais department
