= Alexander Walker (physiologist) =

Alexander Walker (1779–1852) was a Scottish physiologist, aesthetician, encyclopaedist, translator, novelist, and journalist.

He was the founder and editor of The European Review (1824–26), a journal published in English, French, German and Italian, with many eminent contributors, such as Goethe and Cuvier. He was a friend of Benjamin Constant and translated his work.

However he was most famous for his best-selling works linking physiology and aesthetics: Physiognomy, founded on Physiology (1834), Beauty, illustrated chiefly by ananalysis and classification of Beauty in Women (1836), and Woman physiologically considered as to mind, morals, matrimonial slavery, infidelity and divorce (1839). A great deal of what he wrote in this line is now considered to belong to the pseudosciences of physiognomy and phrenology.
