= Clarques =

- Part of Saint-Augustin
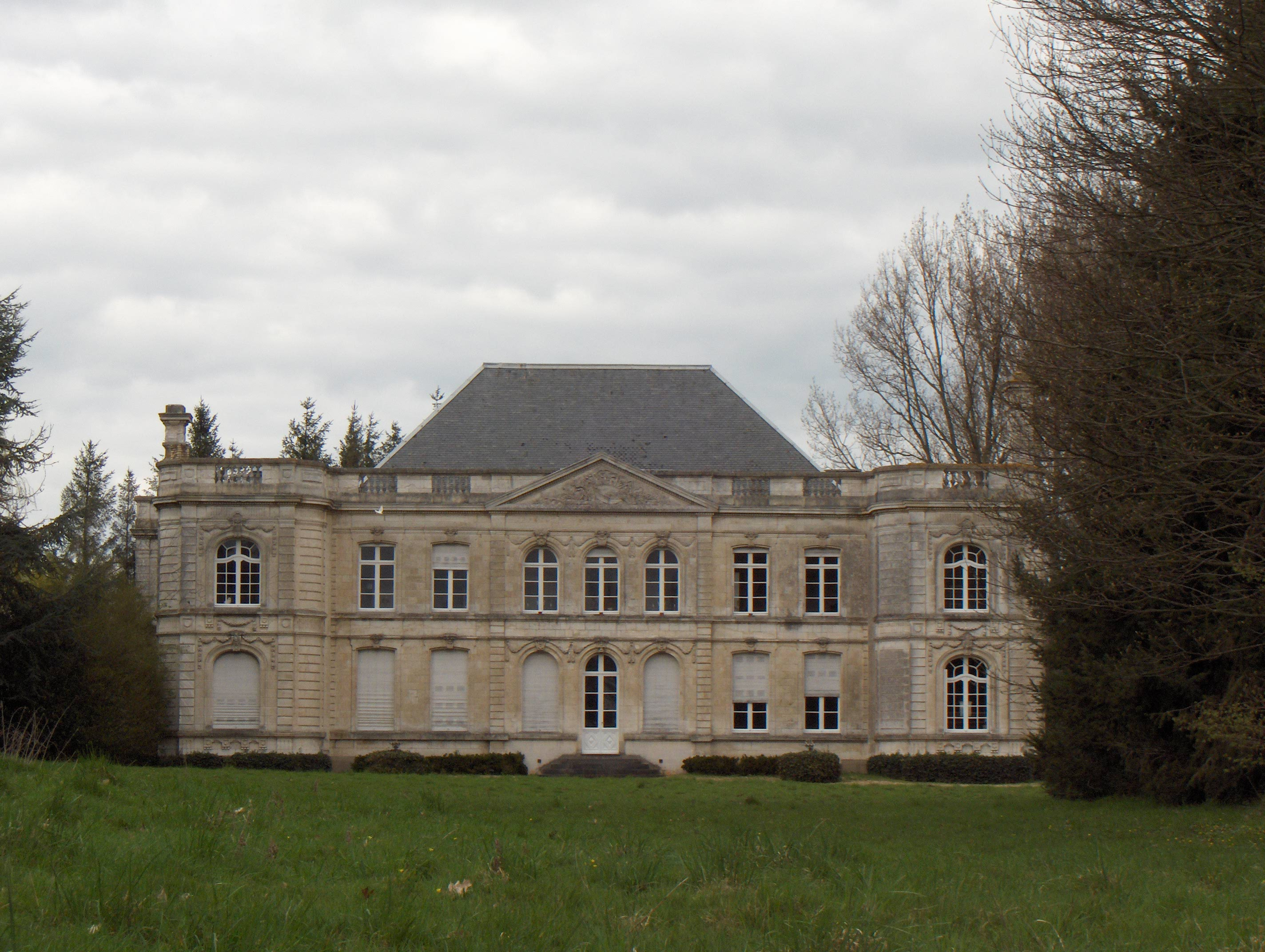
- Chateau

- Coat of arms
- Location of Clarques
- Location within France Location within Hauts-de-France
- Coordinates: 50°38′50″N 2°16′42″E
- Country: France
- Region: Hauts-de-France
- Department: Pas-de-Calais
- Arrondissement: Saint-Omer
- Canton: Fruges
- Commune: Saint-Augustin
- Area^{1}: 6.96 km^{2} (2.69 sq mi)
- Elevation: 66 m (217 ft)
- Highest elevation: 97 m (318 ft)
- Lowest elevation: 29 m (95 ft)
- Population (2018): 309
  - Density: 44.4/km^{2} (115/sq mi)
- Time zone: UTC+01:00 (CET)
  - Summer (DST): UTC+02:00 (CEST)
- Postal code: 62129
- ^{1} French Land Register data, which excludes lakes, ponds, glaciers > 1 km^{2} (0.386 sq mi or 247 acres) and river estuaries.

Clarques (French pronunciation: [klaʁk]; Picard: Clarque) is a former commune in the Pas-de-Calais department in the Hauts-de-France region of France. On 1 January 2016, it was merged into the new commune Saint-Augustin.

== Geography ==
A farming village situated 8 miles (13 km) south of Saint-Omer, on the D190 and D192 road junction. The A26 autoroute passes by the commune just 200 yards (180 m) away.

== Population ==
Historical population
Year	Pop.	±% p.a.
1962	274	—
1968	254	−1.26%
1975	238	−0.93%
1982	206	−2.04%
1990	231	+1.44%
1999	233	+0.10%
2006	254	+1.24%
2018	309	+1.65%
Source: EHESS and INSEE

== Places of interest ==
- The church of St.Martin, dating from the seventeenth century.
- The remains of two abbeys: The Benedictine abbey of Saint-Jean-au-Mont, founded in 1080 by Hubert, Bishop of Thérouanne, was destroyed in 1537 during military operations and the community took refuge at Ypres. The other abbey was founded in 1131 as an Augustinian (Premonstratensian order) by Milon, Bishop of Thérouanne, which survived until the French Revolution.
- A watermill
- A chateau

The present chateau was built in the early 1780s by Augustin Titelouze de Gournay, a king's musketeer, before his marriage to Marie-Therese de Feuchin in 1788. The house was enlarged in 1905 by Joseph de Gournay from the plans of architect Lillois Vilain, adding the protruding wings.

== See also ==
- Communes of the Pas-de-Calais department
