= David-Louis Constant de Rebecque =

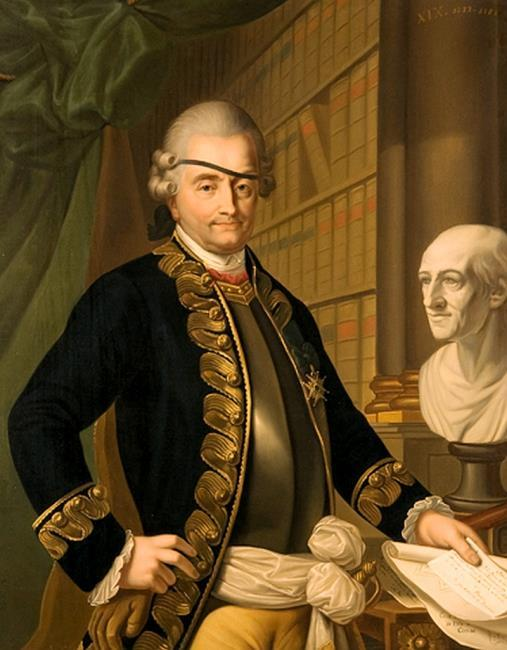
Portrait of David-Louis Constant d'Hermenches as Maréchal de camp of Île de Ré by Jean-Baptiste Bonjour 1839 in the depot of the Rijksdienst voor het Cultureel Erfgoed in Rijswijk

David-Louis Constant de Rebecque (17 November 1722 – 25 February 1785) was a Swiss military officer who served in the Dutch States Army and French Royal Army. He is also known for his contact with Voltaire and his correspondence with Isabelle de Charrière.

== Early life and family ==
Constant d'Hermenches was born in Lausanne into the Constant de Rebecque family. He was the eldest son of Samuel Constant de Rebecque and his wife, Rose Suzanne née de Saussure de Bercher (1698–1782). His father was a mercenary in the Dutch States Army and a veteran of the War of the Spanish Succession. Later he raised a small Swiss regiment in the Dutch States Army. He bought the seignories of Hermenches in 1725 and Villars-Mendraz in 1753.

== Career ==
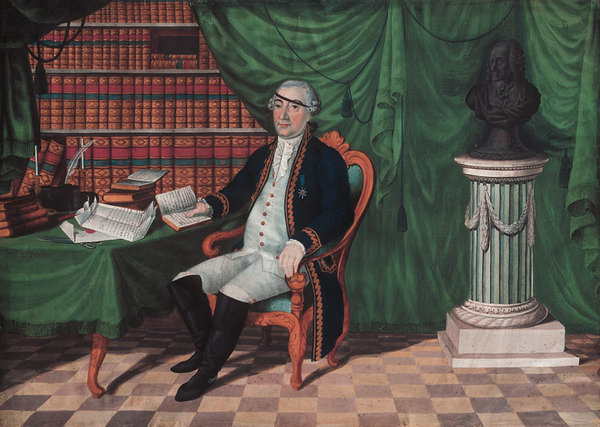
David-Louis Constant de Rebecque, Gouache of the collection of Mrs. Noel Blakiston, London.

Constant d'Hermenches joined the Dutch States Army in 1736, serving as cadet in his father's regiment. He was promoted to captain in 1741 and served as an aide-de-camp to his father at the Battle of Fontenoy, where he was wounded. He covered the scar above his left eye with a black band across his forehead. Constant d'Hermenches was given command of the Prince of Orange's company in 1748. In 1764, he joined the French Royal Army, and served with the Eptingen Regiment in the French conquest of Corsica in 1768. Constant d'Hermenches reached the rank of maréchal de camp in 1780, and also served as governor of La Rochelle. He died in Paris on 25 February 1785.

He kept up a long correspondence (1760-1776) with Isabelle van Tuyll van Serooskerken, the future Isabelle de Charrière.

== Family ==
Constant d'Hermenches entered an arranged marriage in 1744 with the daughter of the mayor of Lausanne Louise Anna Jeanne Françoise de Seigneux (1715–1772). In The Hague in 1750 they had a son Guillaume Anne de Constant Rebecque de Villars with as godparents William IV, Prince of Orange and his wife Anne, Princess Royal and Princess of Orange. Louise de Seigneux died 12 september 1772 in Lausanne.

From his first marriage to Louise Anna Jeanne Françoise de Seigneux (1715-1772):

- Guillaume Anne de Constant Rebecque de Villars (The Hague, 24 April 1750 – The Hague, 12 August 1832): married to Constance Francine de Lynden. He was incorporated into the Dutch nobility.
- Constance Louise de Constant de Rebecque (Lausanne, 16 August 1755 – Lausanne, 12 March 1825): married 8 december 1785 Marc-Antoine de Cazenove d'Arlens (Amsterdam, 1748-Lausanne, 1822). She is known as writer.

In 1776 he remarried Marie Catherine Philippine de Préseau, née Taisnes de Rémonval (1743-1779). From this marriage:

- Auguste de Constant de Rebecque (Aubonne, 1 November 1777 - Mézery, 14 February 1862).

He had a daughter out of wedlock with Bénigne Buchet, his housekeeper/nursemaid:

- Sophie Jeanne Louise Joly Dufey (Nernier, summer 1753 - Montheron, 10 January 1841): married François Verdeil (Berlin, 1747- Lausanne, 1832).

== Works and correspondences ==
- Constant d'Hermenches, David-Louis; Voltaire (1988). Courtney, C. P. (ed.). Pamphlets and occasional pieces with replies by Voltaire. Daemon. ISBN 978-0-9510166-3-3.
- Isabelle de Charrière, [Collected works:] Œuvres complètes, Édition critique par J-D. Candaux, C.P. Courtney, Pierre and Simone Dubois, P. Thompson, J. Vercruysse, D.M. Wood. Amsterdam, G.A. van Oorschot, 1979-1984 10 volumes: Tomes 1-6, Correspondance; tome 10, Essais, Vers, Musique. ISBN 9789028205000
  - Ik heb geen talent voor ondergeschiktheid: Belle van Zuylen in briefwisseling met Constant d'Hermenches, James Boswell en Werner C.W. van Pallandt. Van Oorschot. 1987. ISBN 9789028206557
  - Une liaison dangereuse : correspondance [de Belle de Zuylen] avec Constant d’Hermenches (1760-1776), éd. Isabelle et Jean-Louis Vissière, Paris, La Différence, 1991, ISBN 2729107169
  - Aru kiken-na kankei - Agnes to d'Hermenches [Une liaison dangereuse - Agnès et d'Hermenches]. In: Omon Ronso, [Bulletin de la Faculté de droit, Nihon Université, Tokyo] 36 (1993), 40 (1995), 44 (1997), 45 (1997), 46 (1998), 48 (1998), 50 (2000), 52 (2001), 56 (2003), 57 (2003), 61 (2004), 67 (2006), 68 (2007), 70 (2008), 72 (2008). Translation Michikazu Tamai. ISSN 0288-1411
    - Aru kikenna kankei : Aniesu to derumanshu. Translation Michikazu Tamai. Tokyo, Surugadai Shuppansha, 2011. 272 p. ISBN 9784411022332
  - There are no letters like yours. The correspondence of Isabelle de Charrière and Constant d'Hermences. Translated, with an introduction and annotations by Janet Whatley and Malcolm Whatley. Lincoln NE, University of Nebraska Press, 2000. xxxv, 549 p. ISBN 978-0-8032-1714-0
- van Strien, Kees (2005). Isabelle de Charriere/(Belle de Zuylen): Early Writings : New Materials from Dutch Archives. Peeters Publishers. ISBN 978-90-429-1646-3.
- Voltaire; Constant d'Hermenches, David-Louis (1956). Roulin, Alfred (ed.). Lettres inédites à Constant d'Hermenches. Buchet/Chastel.
- Voltaire; Besterman, Theodore (1976). Correspondence and Related Documents [of Voltaire]. Voltaire Foundation. ISBN 978-0-7294-0036-7.
- Jérôme Vercruysse. La première d'"Olympie". Trois lettres de Mme Denis aux Constant d'Hermenches. Studies on Voltaire and the Eighteenth Century, 1977, 163/19, pp. 19–29 [26 janvier 1762, 9 février 1762, 25 décembre 1773]

== Bibliography ==
- Dorette Berthoud, David-Louis Constant d'Hermenches et la conquête de la Corse. Revue de la Fondation pour l'histoire des Suisses à l'étranger, 1961, 10, p. 13-18
- Pierre H. Dubois, Ambiguité comme forme de vie. La correspondance de Belle de Zuylen - Constant d'Hermenches. Documentatieblad werkgroep Achttiende eeuw 1975, p. 73 – 88
- Yvette Went-Daoust, La correspondance Belle van Zuylen - Constant d'Hermenches. Enfermement et cosmopolitisme. In: Expériences limites de l'épistolaire. Lettres d'exil, d'enfermement, de folie. Actes du colloque de Caen, 16-18 juin 1991. éd. André Magnan. Paris, Champion, 1993, p. 327-339.
- Colette Martin Henriette, Isabelle de Charrière, femme de lettres, étude de la correspondence entre Belle de Zuylen/Isabelle de Charrière et David-Louis Constant d'Hermenches. Dissertation University of Maryland, College Park, 1994.
- Isabelle Vissière, L'encre et le fiel ou La cruauté souriante de Constant d'Hermenches. In: Une Européenne. Isabelle de Charrière en son siècle. Hauterive, Attinger, 1994. p. 229-243
- Isabelle Vissière, Un militaire philosophe: Constant d'Hermenches, In: L'armée au XVIIIe siècle (1715-1789). Actes de colloque du C.A.E.R. XVIII, Aix-en-Provence, 13-14-15 juin 1996 éd. Geneviève Goubier-Robert. Aix-en-Provence, Publications de l'Université de Provence, 1999. p. 241-251
- Isabelle Vissière, Plaidoyer pour Constant d'Hermenches. In: Annales Benjamin Constant, 22, 1999, p. 19-44.
- Colette Henriette, How Belle de Zuylen's Correspondence with Constant d'Hermenches Shaped Isabelle de Charrière's Literary Works. In: L'Esprit Créateur, Johns Hopkins University Press, 40, 4, 2000, p. 25-30
- Nathalie Marcoux, Les ruses du corps dans la correspondance d'Isabelle de Charrière (Belle de Zuylen) avec Constant d'Hermenches (1760-1776). La sphère privée. In: Ecritures de la ruse. Publication de la SATOR - Société d'analyse de la topique romanesque, 13e colloque, mai 1999, Toronto / éd.: Elzbieta Grodek. Amsterdam, Rodopi, 2000, p. 125-134.
- Monik Richard, Les ruses du corps dans la correspondance d'Isabelle de Charrière (Belle de Zuylen) avec Constant d'Hermenches (1760-1776). La sphère publique. In: Ecritures de la ruse. Publication de la SATOR - Société d'analyse de la topique romanesque, 13e colloque, mai 1999, Toronto / éd.: Elzbieta Grodek. Amsterdam, Rodopi, 2000, p. 135-141.
- Isabelle Vissière, Lausanne. Un laboratoire littéraire au 18e siècle [Théâtre au château 'Mon Repos']. In: Vie des salons et activités littéraires, de Marguerite de Valois à Mme de Staël. Actes du colloque international de Nancy (6-8 octobre 1999), éd. Roger Marchal. Nancy, Presses Universitaires de Nancy, 2001, p. 233-241.
- Manfred Hinz, Am Ursprung der ‘romantischen‘ Volkshelden. James Boswell, Belle de Zuylen, David-Louis Constant d’Hermenches, und die Korsische Frage. In: Esprit civique und Engagement. Festschrift für Henning Krauß zum 60. Geburtstag. Hrsg. von Hanspeter Plocher. Tübingen, Stauffenburg-Verlag, 2003, p. 187–210
- Jürgen Siess, Inversion de rôles, différence des sexes. Isabelle de Charrière et les deux Constant. In: Cahiers Isabelle de Charrière / Belle de Zuylen papers 3, 2008. p. 24-39
- Jürgen Siess, Isabelle de Zuylen-Charrière. Du désir d'indépendance au projet d'égalité avec les deux Constant. In: Vers un nouveau mode de relations entre les sexes. Six correspondances de femmes des Lumières. [Émilie du Châtelet, Julie de Lespinasse, Marie-Jeanne Riccoboni, Marianne de La Tour, Isabelle de Charrière et Éléonore de Sabran]. Paris, Garnier, 2017. p. 109 - 130 (ISBN 978-2-406-05767-3)
