= Rebecques =

- Part of Saint-Augustin
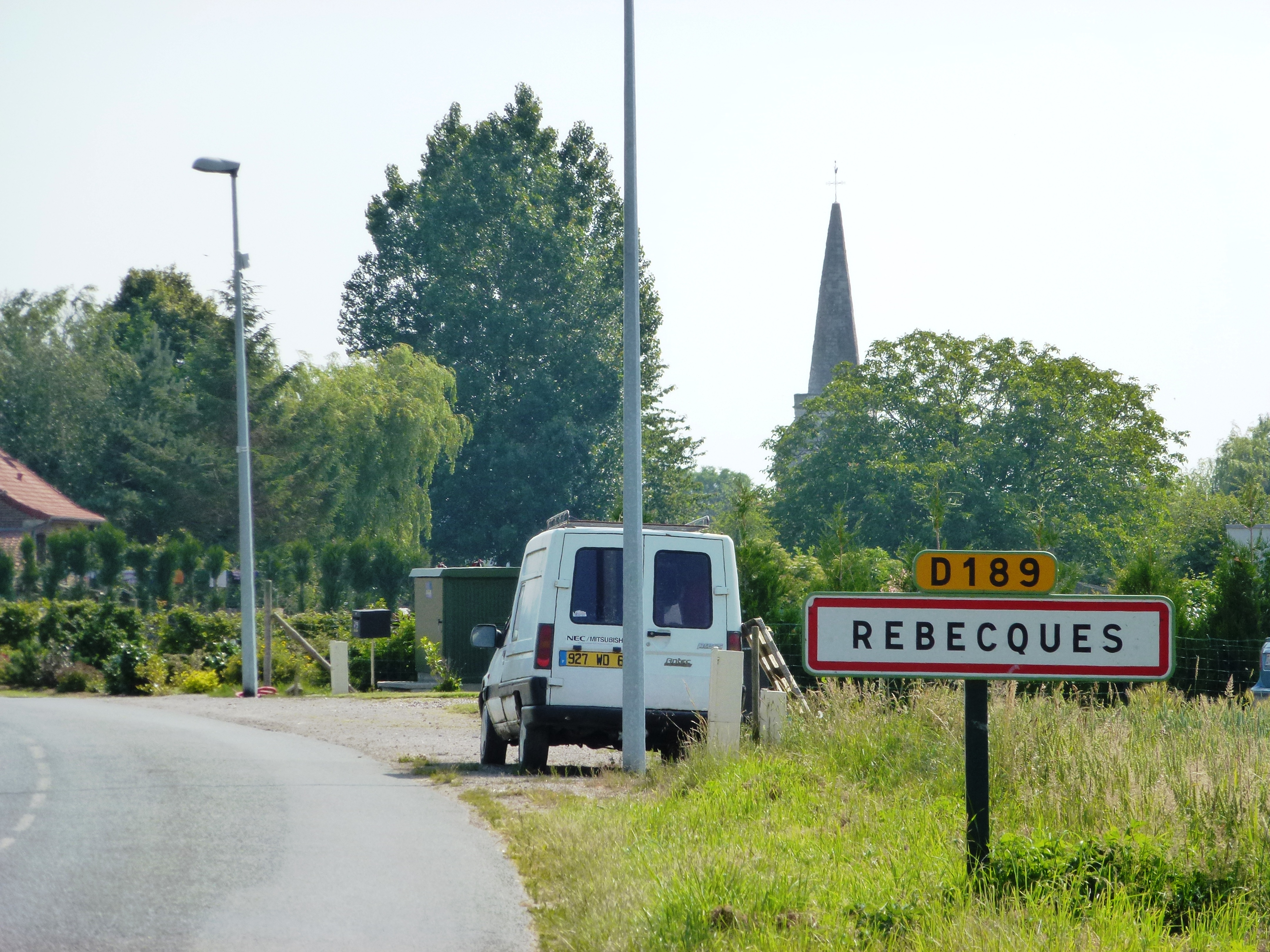

- Coat of arms
- Location of Rebecques
- Location within France Location within Hauts-de-France
- Coordinates: 50°38′46″N 2°18′25″E
- Country: France
- Region: Hauts-de-France
- Department: Pas-de-Calais
- Arrondissement: Saint-Omer
- Canton: Fruges
- Commune: Saint-Augustin
- Area^{1}: 4.84 km^{2} (1.87 sq mi)
- Elevation: 90 m (300 ft)
- Highest elevation: 74 m (243 ft)
- Lowest elevation: 24 m (79 ft)
- Population (2018): 494
  - Density: 102/km^{2} (264/sq mi)
- Time zone: UTC+01:00 (CET)
  - Summer (DST): UTC+02:00 (CEST)
- Postal code: 62120
- ^{1} French Land Register data, which excludes lakes, ponds, glaciers > 1 km^{2} (0.386 sq mi or 247 acres) and river estuaries.

Rebecques (French pronunciation: [ʁəbɛk]; Dutch: Roosbeek; Picard: Arbècque) is a former commune in the Pas-de-Calais department in northern France. On 1 January 2016, it was merged into the new commune Saint-Augustin.

== Geography ==
Rebecques lies about 7 miles (12 km) south of Saint-Omer, on the D192 road, in the valley of the River Lys.

== Population ==
Historical population
Year	Pop.	±% p.a.
1962	376	—
1968	377	+0.04%
1975	373	−0.15%
1982	367	−0.23%
1990	397	+0.99%
1999	398	+0.03%
2007	426	+0.85%
2012	464	+1.72%
2018	494	+1.05%
Source: EHESS and INSEE

== Places of interest ==
- The church of Saint Maclou, dating from the sixteenth century.

== See also ==
- Communes of the Pas-de-Calais department
