= Alexis-Michel Eenens =

Belgian lieutenant-general, military historian, and politician

Alexis Michel Eenens
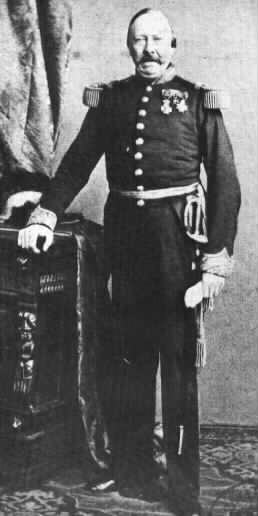
- Eenens, c. 1870
- Born: 29 June 1805; Brussels, First French Empire
- Died: 9 January 1883 (aged 77); Schaerbeek, Belgium
- Occupation: politician

Alexis Michel Eenens (29 June 1805 – 9 January 1883) was a Belgian lieutenant-general, military historian, and politician.

== Biography ==
=== Family life ===
Eenens was the son of a wealthy merchant in textiles, Louis Eenens, and Anne-Marie Carlier. He was born in Brussels when Belgium was annexed to the French Empire, and the French Republican calendar was still in force, and his birthday is therefore properly 10 messidor An XIII. He married Adélaïde Barbe Joseph Gilain in Tienen on 8 August 1869. They had one daughter, Thérèse Marie Euphrasie Josèphe, who married a future procureur-général at the Belgian Supreme Court, Georges-Marie Viscount Terlinden.

=== Military and political career ===
He was admitted to the Artillerie- en Genieschool (Artillery and Engineering School) of the army of the United Kingdom of the Netherlands in Delft on 15 July 1825 as a cadet. On 20 November 1828, he was promoted to sergeant-major and allowed to study at the Royal Military Academy in Breda. He was promoted to the second lieutenant in the artillery and assigned to the 5th battalion Militia Artillery at Namur on 5 January 1830, on the eve of the Belgian Revolution.

Eenens joined the revolutionaries by taking part in a mutiny of the Namur garrison in September 1830. As a reward, he was breveted lieutenant by the Belgian Provisional Government and soon after promoted to captain. Stationed in Antwerp, he refused to defect to the Dutch with General Van der Smissen on 25 March 1831. He then joined the Belgian troops at Leuven and helped to defend that city in August.

In 1834 he killed another Belgian captain in a duel on the battlefield of Waterloo. He was acquitted by the court martial because Belgium at that time did not have a law against duelling. That same year he tried to resign his commission but was not allowed to, because he had promised to serve ten years after his admission to the Royal military academy.

In 1839, at the suggestion of King Leopold I of Belgium, he took a leave of absence to act as an observer in Egypt. He explored commercial possibilities for Belgium and visited Ethiopia (then known as "Abyssinia") together with the Belgian consul in Alexandria to try to establish a Belgian colonial outpost on the west coast of the Red Sea. However, illness forced him to return to Belgium in December 1840.

He was promoted to major in 1842 and to lieutenant-colonel in 1845. Then in 1846, he tried to go into politics as a Liberal Party representative. As this was an oppositional party, the king put him on non-active status. He was elected to the Belgian Chamber of Representatives on 8 June 1847, but a new law prohibiting military officers to sit in parliament forced him to give up his seat in May 1848. He then re-entered active duty.

Eenens was promoted to colonel on 24 June 1853 and put in charge of an artillery regiment in Tournai. On 8 May 1859, he was promoted to major-general and given the command of the First Artillery Brigade. He also became a member of the Munitions Committee and other advisory commissions. On 24 June 1866, he was promoted to lieutenant-general and Inspector-general of the Belgian Artillery. On 15 July 1870, he was put in charge of the army at Antwerp where he became military governor (and at the same time aide de camp of King Leopold II of Belgium) on 6 October 1870.

In view of the dangerous international situation (the Franco-Prussian War had just started), Eenens now pleaded for strengthening the Belgian defenses, but the Cabinet of prime minister Jules Malou opposed this, supported by the Catholic party of Charles Woeste. Disgusted, Eenens retired from active service on 18 May 1873. He remained aide de camp of the king, who conferred the Grand Cordon of the Order of Leopold on him.

=== Scholarly work ===
Besides his military career, Eenens also pursued a more scholarly career. In the 1840s he promoted the involvement of the Belgian army in the agricultural development of the poorer parts of Belgium. In 1844 he published Notes sur le défrichement de la Campine par l'armée, a pamphlet containing his proposals, but his ideas were rejected by the agricultural establishment.

He also became a prolific writer on military history, specializing in the history of the Belgian Revolution. In 1875, he published Documents historiques sur l'origine du royaume de Belgique. Les conspirations militaires de 1831 (Bruxelles, 1875, 2 vols.), which caused quite a furore because he accused a number of prominent people of treasonous behavior during the revolution, in favor of the Orangist cause. This caused a fervent polemic, both with Belgian politicians and historians and with Dutch military historians, because he also accused the future King William II of the Netherlands (then commander-in-chief of the Dutch forces that attempted to suppress the revolution of 1830) of violating an armistice. Because of the scandal this polemic caused, the king asked him to relent, and when he demurred, relieved him of his function as aide de camp.

Eenens also became involved in the controversy about the accusations of cowardice the British military historian William Siborne had leveled at the Dutch-Belgian troops at the Battle of Waterloo in his 1844 book History of the War in France and Belgium in 1815. The Belgian general Renard had in 1855 already attempted a refutation as had the Dutch general Willem Jan Knoop in 1846. Eenens published his own "Dissertation sur la participation des troupes des Pays-Bas à la campagne de 1815 en Belgique" in 1879. This critical assessment of Siborne's work is still relevant.

Eenens died in Schaerbeek on 9 January 1883.

== Sources ==
- (in French) Leconte, L. (1954) "La vie étonnante du lieutenant-général Eenens", in: Carnet de la Fourragère, vol. XI, pp. 283–314.
