= Johann Reinhold Forster =

German naturalist (1729–1798)

Johann Reinhold Forster FRS FSA
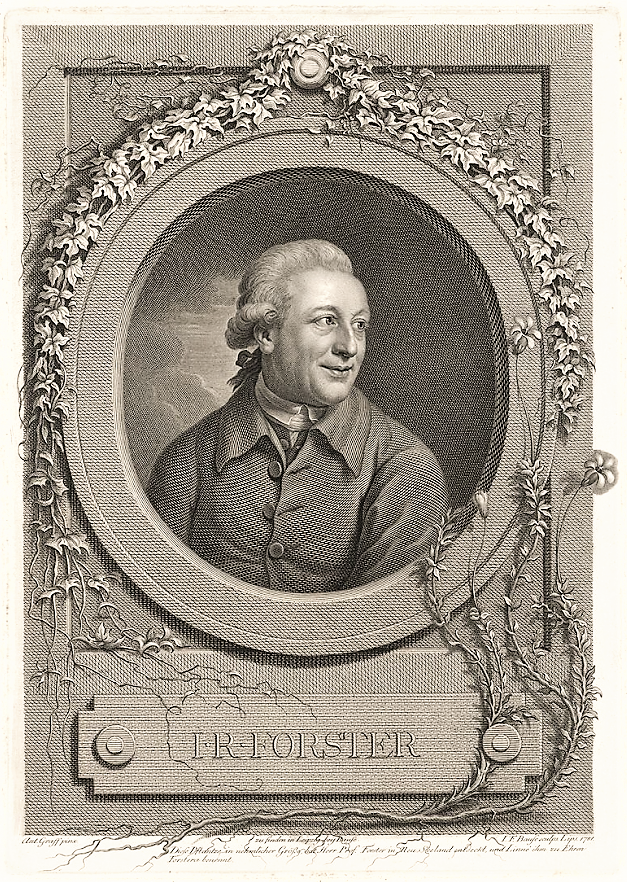
- Engraving of Forster, 1781
- Born: 22 October 1729; Dirschau (Tczew), Polish–Lithuanian Commonwealth
- Died: 9 December 1798 (aged 69); Halle (Saale), Electorate of Brandenburg, Kingdom of Prussia, Holy Roman Empire
- Children: George Forster
- Scientific career
- Fields: Natural history, ethnology
- Workplaces: Warrington Academy; University of Halle
- Author abbrev. (botany): J.R.Forst

Johann Reinhold Forster (German: [ˈfɔʁstɐ]; 22 October 1729 – 9 December 1798) was a German Reformed pastor and naturalist. Born in Dirschau, Pomeranian Voivodeship, Polish–Lithuanian Commonwealth (now Tczew, Poland), he attended school in Dirschau and Marienwerder before being admitted at the Joachimsthal Gymnasium in Berlin in 1745. Skilled in classical and biblical languages, he studied theology at the University of Halle. In 1753, he became a parson at a parish just south of Danzig. He married his cousin Justina Elisabeth Nicolai in 1754, and they had seven children; the oldest child was George Forster, also known as Georg.

In 1765, Forster was commissioned by the Russian government to inspect the new colonies on the Volga. Accompanied by George on the journey, he observed the conditions of the colonists and made scientific observations that were later read at the Russian Academy of Sciences. After making a report that was critical of the Russian administration, Forster left for England without payment in 1766. In England, Forster became the successor of Joseph Priestley as tutor in modern languages and natural history at Warrington Academy where he worked for two years. He made contact with many other naturalists, published a textbook on mineralogy and translated works of the apostles of Linnaeus into English. Invited by the geographer Alexander Dalrymple, Forster moved to London in 1770 in preparation for participation in an East India Company expedition, but the plans fell through. Forster continued to publish translations and scientific works including contributions to North American zoology and botany. In February 1772, he was elected a Fellow of the Royal Society.

After the withdrawal of Joseph Banks from the second voyage of James Cook, Forster accepted the position of naturalist on Cook's ship, where he was accompanied by his son George as draughtsman and assistant. On their three-year journey, they made the first recorded crossing of the Antarctic Circle and made observations and discoveries in New Zealand and Polynesia. When they returned to England, Forster published the botanical work Characteres generum plantarum. However, there was disagreement with Cook on who should write a narrative of the journey. After a lengthy argument, George wrote A Voyage Round the World, which appeared six weeks before Cook's account. Forster separately published his scientific Observations Made During a Voyage Round the World.

Forster's pride and obstinacy caused him to fall out with many powerful men in England; after clearing some of his substantial debt with the aid of German patrons, he returned to Germany where he was a professor at the University of Halle from 1780. He oversaw the university's botanical garden for a few years and published in a wide range of sciences. Forster died in 1798 and is buried in Halle. He is commemorated in the names of various species of plants and animals, including the genera Forstera and Forsterygion.

== Early life and education ==
Johann Reinhold Forster was born on 22 October 1729 in Dirschau, Pomeranian Voivodeship, Polish–Lithuanian Commonwealth (now Tczew, Poland). Forster's family traced its origins to a Yorkshire-born ancestor called George Forster, a descendant of the Scottish Forrester family. This ancestor had emigrated from England after supporting the losing Royalist side in the English Civil War and had become a merchant in Neuenburg (Nowe) in the 1640s. Forster's father was Georg Reinhold Forster and his mother was Eva Plaht, the daughter of Dirschau's mayor Johann Wolff and the widow of Martin Plaht. Georg Reinhold became mayor of Dirschau in 1733 (as the third Forster in this position) but became an invalid in 1735 and had to retire as mayor. Forster attended a Latin school in Dirschau, and then went to Marienwerder (Kwidzyn) to attend the gymnasium in 1743.

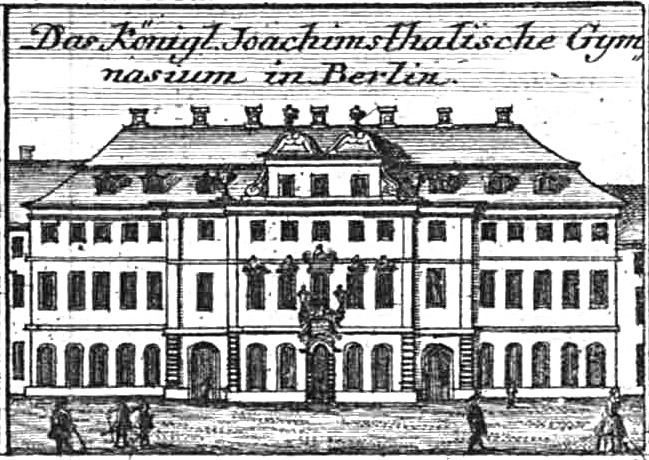
The Joachimsthalsches Gymnasium in Berlin in 1757

In May 1745, Forster was admitted at the Joachimsthalsches Gymnasium in Berlin, a reputable institution. His teachers included Johann Philipp Heinius, the school rector, who taught theology, Hebrew, Roman antiquity and philosophy; and Friedrich Muzel, the school librarian, who taught history, literature, Latin and natural philosophy. Forster quickly became skilled in classical and biblical languages including Coptic and fluent in Latin. He graduated in 1748 together with Karl Franz von Irwing, who became a lifelong friend. Other friends and acquaintances included Louis de Beausobre, August Friedrich Pallas and Carl Gottfried Woide. Forster also sought out the friendship of foreign students to improve his knowledge of modern languages, especially French.

After his time at the gymnasium, Forster wanted to study medicine at the University of Halle but his father wanted him to study law. As a compromise, Forster studied theology in Halle. Little is known about his student days. His academic teachers included theologian Siegmund Jakob Baumgarten and orientalist Christian Benedikt Michaelis.

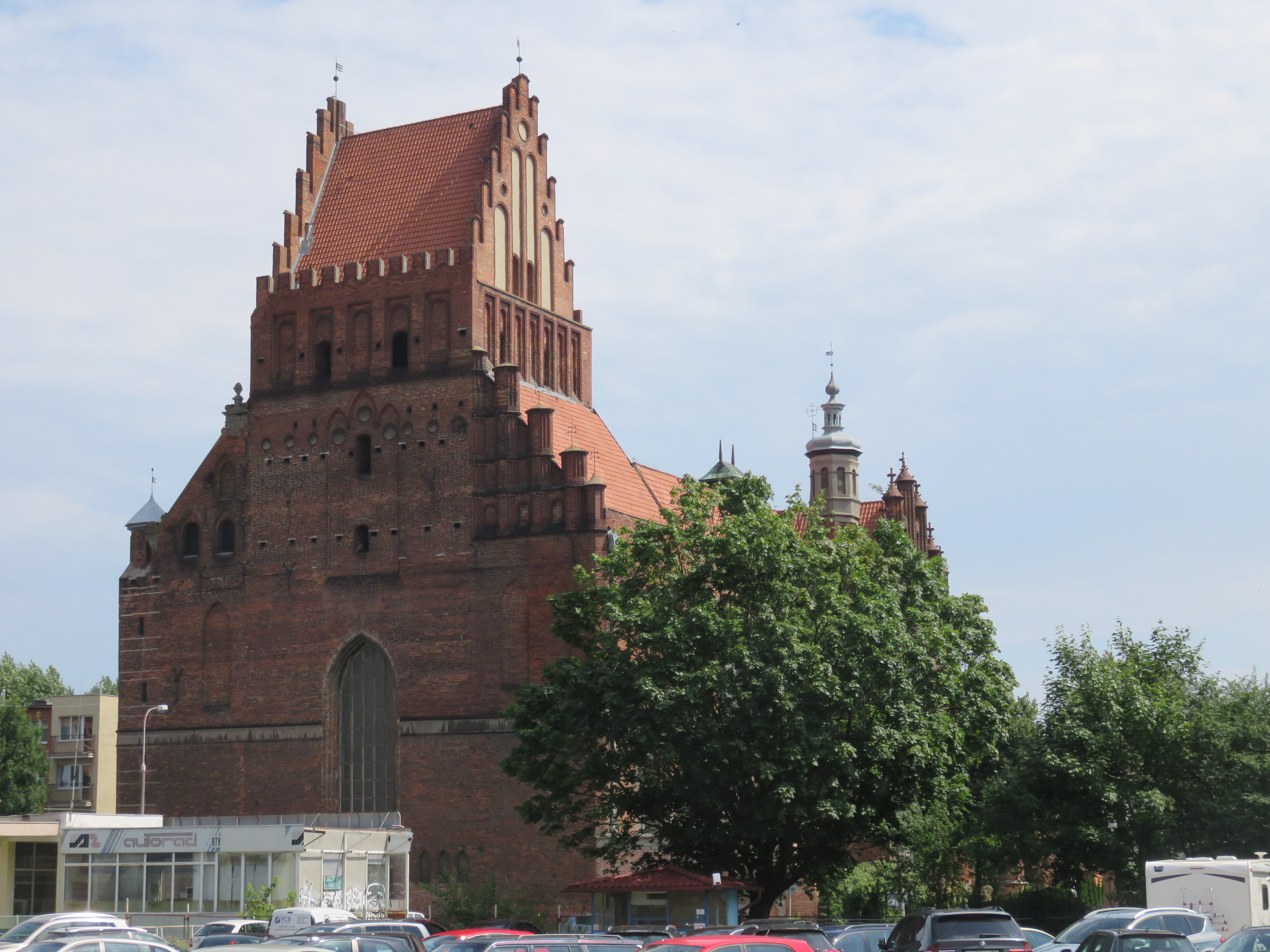
St Peter and Paul church, Danzig

By July 1751, Forster had arrived in Danzig (Gdańsk), where he was a candidate for ordination at the Reformed church of St Peter and Paul. He had a meagre income, and his preaching workload did not allow him to pursue his scholarly interests. His sermons were praised, and his superiors contemplated sending him abroad for additional training. Forster was ordained in Königsberg in August 1753 and (possibly to please his father) accepted the post of parson of the Hochzeit-Nassenhuben parish just south of Danzig, starting there on 23 September 1753.

== Marriage and work as pastor ==
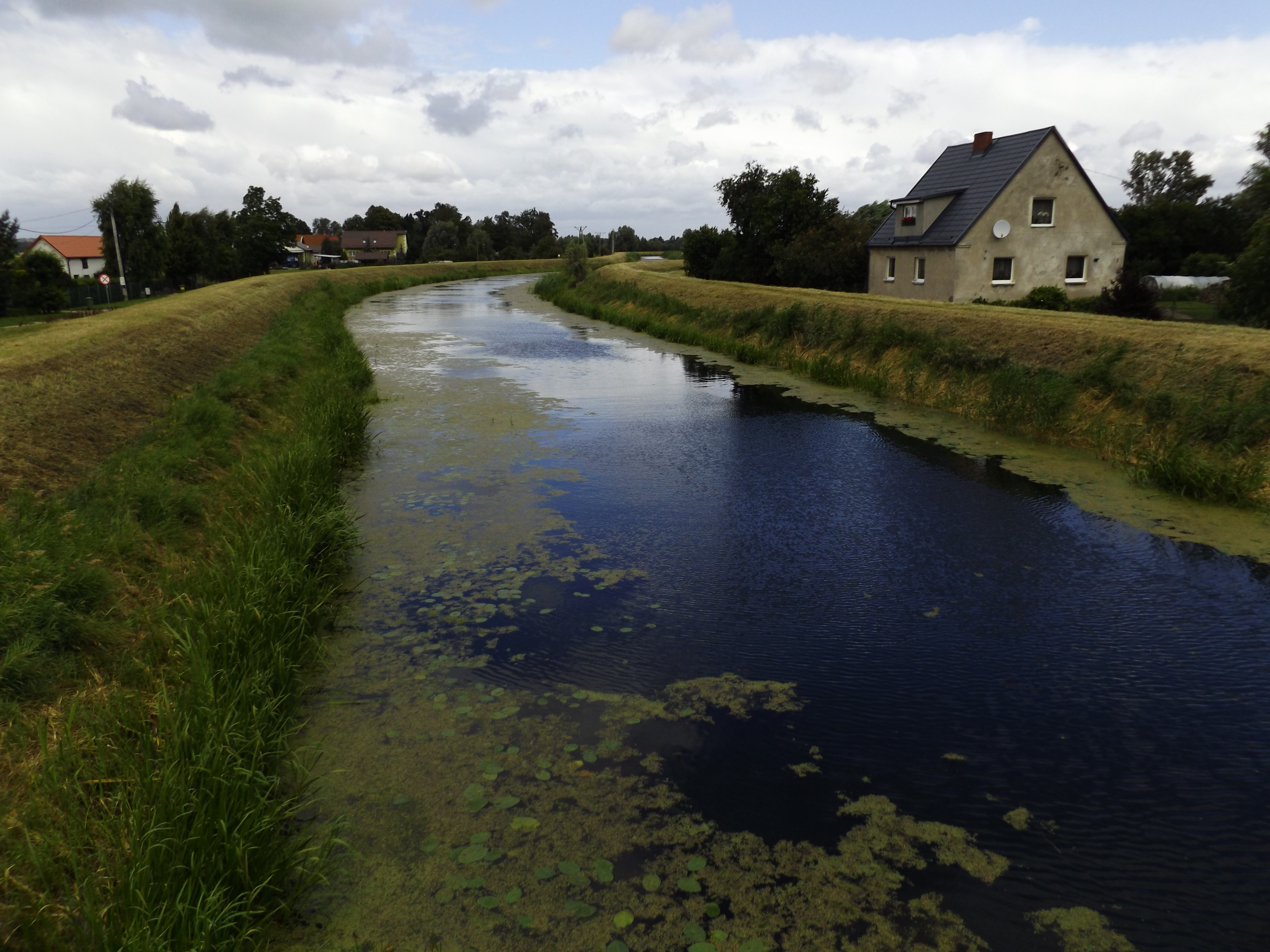
The Mottlau (Motława) river between Hochzeit (Wiślina) and Nassenhuben (Mokry Dwór)

Forster had courted his cousin Justina Elisabeth Nicolai since 1751, but was unable to marry her on his income at the time. His father died on 15 November 1753, not long after Forster obtained the post in Nassenhuben, and Forster sold the family house in Dirschau soon after, in 1754. He married Justina Elisabeth on 26 February 1754 at St Peter and Paul in Danzig. Between 1754 and 1765, they had seven children who survived childbirth, including the eldest son, Johann George Adam Forster, also known as Georg Forster.

Forster spent some of his inheritance on his library, collecting thousands of books. He concentrated on scholarly work (especially Egyptian languages such as Coptic) to the detriment of his duties as a pastor. Sometimes he fell asleep during the church service only to be woken to deliver his sermon. Forster expected to move to a position in Danzig after the one in Nassenhuben, following existing precedent, but this did not materialise. In 1757, he wrote to the mathematician Leonhard Euler in an attempt to find a position at the new Imperial Moscow University; while he obtained a recommendation, nothing came of it because of the intensifying Seven Years' War. Russian troops occupied the area surrounding Danzig in May 1758, including the Hochzeit-Nassenhuben parish. Forster did not leave for the relative safety of Danzig, but stayed with his parishioners and protected them against excesses of the occupying Russian troops by directly making demands of the Russian commander-in-chief, William Fermor.

Forster's son George was interested in the study of nature from an early age, and so Reinhold, to satisfy his son's curiosity, bought Carl Linnaeus's Systema Naturae and other books, learned natural history from them and then taught his son. Other subjects of this instruction were Latin, French, religion, writing and arithmetic.

== Russian expedition ==
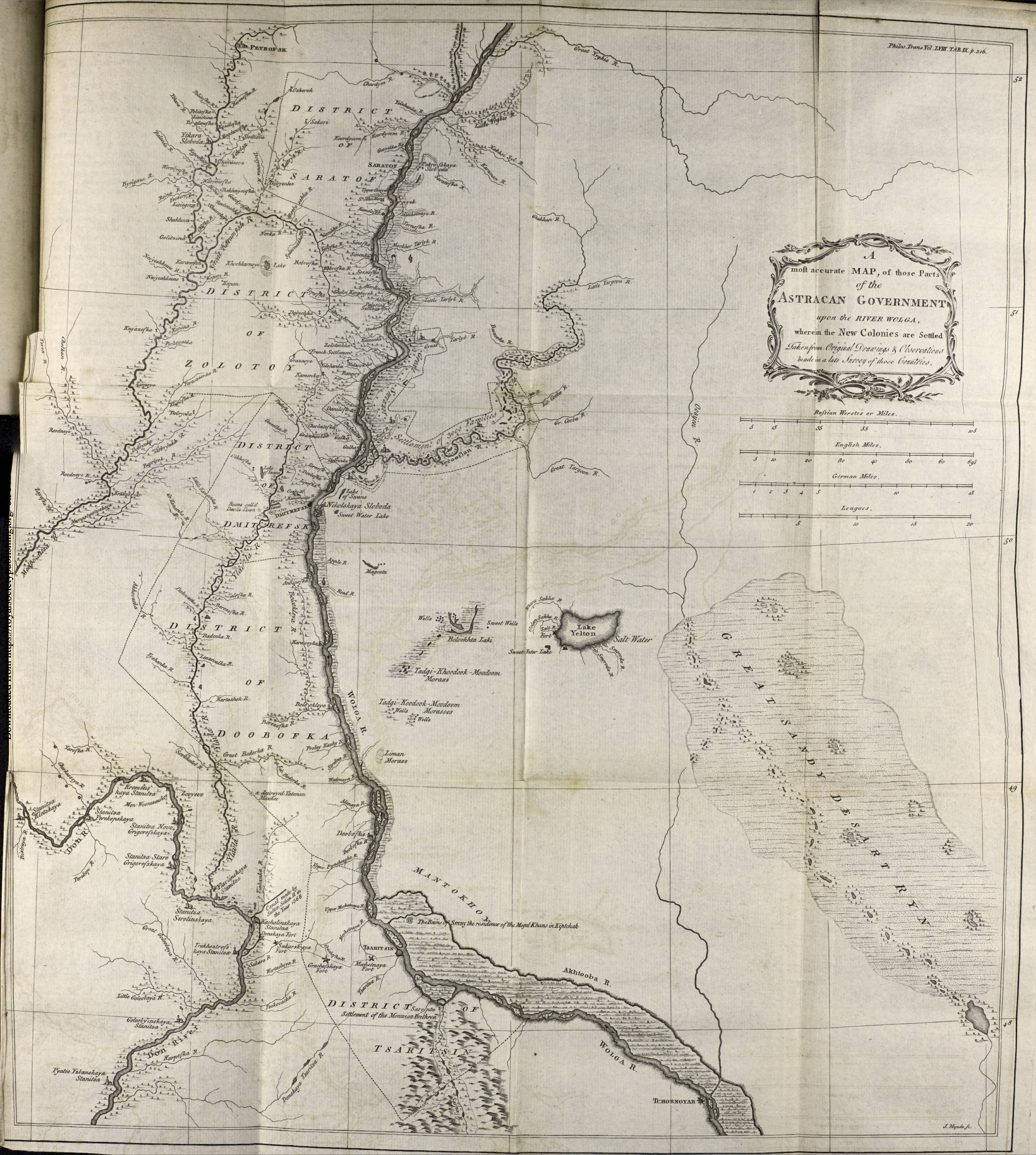
Forster's map of the Volga region, published 1768

In 1765, Forster obtained leave from his pastoral offices and travelled to St Petersburg with ten-year-old George. Their expenses were paid by Hans Wilhelm Rehbinder, a Russian in Danzig who recommended them to Count Grigory Orlov, the favourite of Catherine the Great. Forster was given a commission to inspect the newly founded colonies near Saratov on the Volga River, with the expectation that his report should show that the Volga German colonists were thriving and happy and to dispel rumours to the contrary. Forster also made scientific plans for the journey, which the Academy of Sciences in St Petersburg supported by providing him with reference books and instruments. The Forsters travelled from Moscow to Saratov in May 1765, continuing via Dmitriyevsk (now Kamyshin) to Tsaritsyn (now Volgograd). They reached the Kalmyk Steppe and Lake Elton (where Forster studied the salt industry) and inspected further settlements along the Volga and some of its tributaries before returning to St Petersburg in October. During the 4,000 km (2,500 mi) journey, George collected hundreds of plant specimens, helping his father with naming and identification.

Forster made contact with other scientists, and his scientific observations from the journey were read in several sessions of the Academy of Sciences, introduced by the geologist Johann Gottlieb Lehmann. His report for the Russian government was critical of the conditions for the colonists and the officials in Saratov. After it was received by Orlov and Catherine, Forster was asked to draft regulations for the colonies that would include improved governance and some degree of autonomy, and finished this work in May 1766. Forster hoped for a government post, but when that did not come to pass, he asked for permission to leave Russia and payment of 2000 roubles (Note: For comparison, the annual salary of a Russian metallurgy worker at the time was approximately 25 roubles.) for his time and as compensation for having lost his Nassenhuben post. When he was offered only 1000 roubles, he proudly refused, only receiving 500 roubles from the Russian government much later, in 1771. The Forsters then travelled by ship from Kronstadt to London, where they arrived on 4 October 1766.

== Arrival in England and teaching at Warrington Academy ==
When Forster came to London, he knew very little English. He brought a letter of introduction from Friedrich Dilthey, a Reformed pastor in St Petersburg, to Andrew Planta, pastor of the German Reformed congregation in London and assistant librarian at the British Museum. Planta did not receive Forster as warmly as the latter had expected. Instead of an employment opportunity in England, Planta suggested a pastoral vacancy in North Carolina. Based on the recommendation of Forster's school friend Woide, Planta introduced Forster to the naturalist Daniel Solander, who also worked at the British Museum and was a disciple of Linnaeus. Forster sold some items collected during the Russian expedition, including coins and fossils, and tried to find a salaried position to bring the rest of his family to England. (Note: At the time, Forster's wife and other children were living in Danzig from the sale of Forster's library and supported by her relatives.) He was introduced to the Society of Antiquaries and elected as an Honorary Fellow in January 1767. Based on the observations from the voyage in Russia, he wrote Specimen Historiae Naturalis Volgensis, an essay in Latin on the natural history of the Volga region that was translated into English and then read at the Royal Society and published in the Philosophical Transactions of the Royal Society.

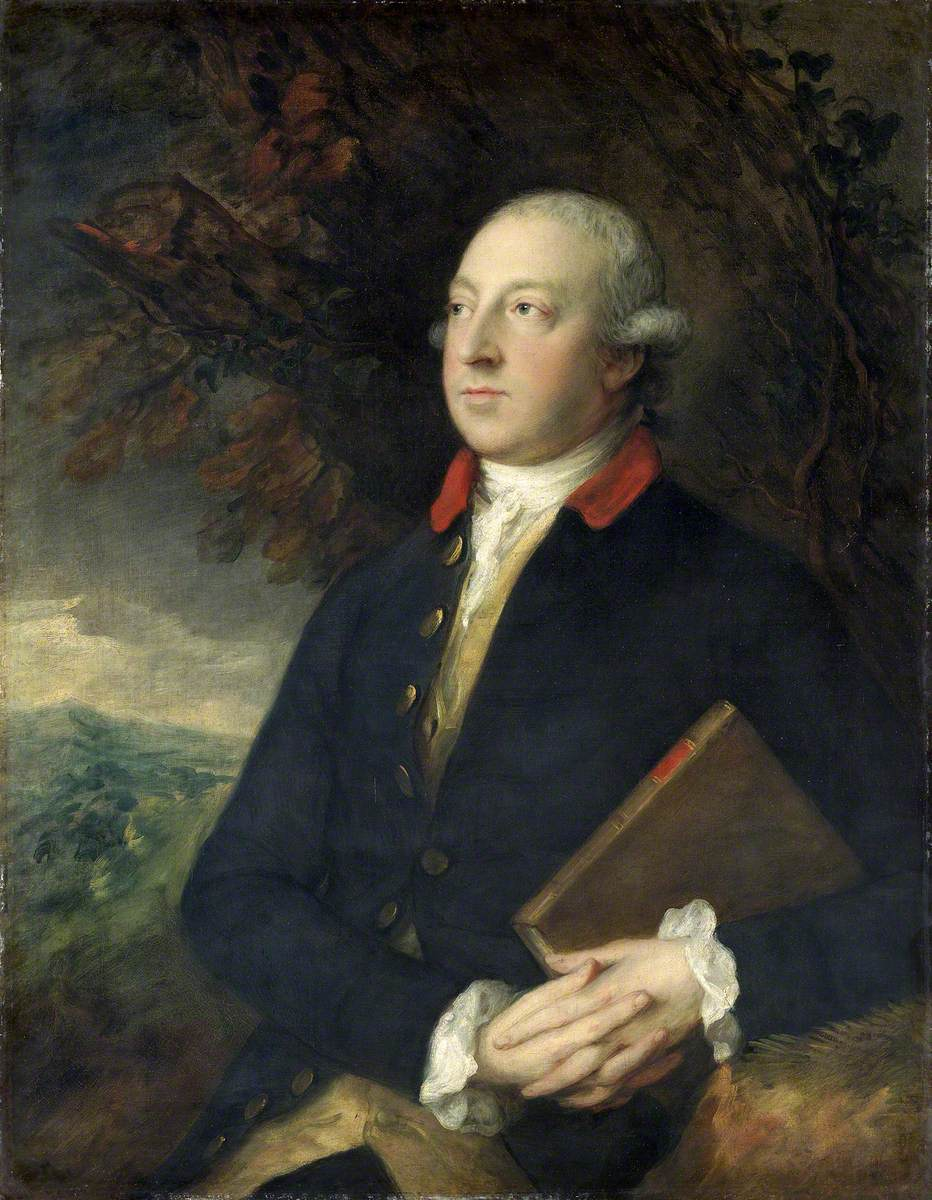
Thomas Pennant, oil painting by Thomas Gainsborough

In June 1767, Forster was appointed as tutor in modern languages and natural history at Warrington Academy, replacing Joseph Priestley, with an annual salary of £60. (Note: A skilled craftsman at the time had an income of about £30 per year.) He reunited with his family who came to Warrington in September 1767. Forster taught French, German, and natural history, and published a textbook on mineralogy in 1768. The geologist and science historian Victor Eyles described Forster's approach as "rather more scientific than some of his contemporaries" and giving a "sound grounding in the subject". Forster became a member of the committee of the Warrington Circulating Library and of the masonic lodge "Lodge of Lights No. 148 Warrington". He made the acquaintance of other people interested in natural history, including John Blackburne and his daughter Anna Blackburne of Orford Hall. Forster helped Blackburne with the arrangement of her insect collection and presented his lectures on entomology to her, while she provided him with access to the family library. He also struck up a friendship with the naturalist Thomas Pennant, whom he visited at Downing Hall in the summer of 1768.

Together with his son George, Forster began to translate the works of three of the apostles of Linnaeus into English: Pehr Kalm's Travels into North America, Pehr Osbeck's A voyage to China and the East Indies, and Pehr Löfling's Travels through Spain and Cumana in South America. Forster increasingly was in financial trouble and started to teach French at the grammar school in Winwick, sharing the duties with his son, who taught the less able pupils. In early 1769, Forster's debts and a dispute about discipline and corporeal punishment caused a rift between him and his colleagues, especially John Seddon, and Forster was dismissed, leaving the Academy in June 1769. Religious differences may also have played a role in the dispute. Forster then taught languages at the Boteler Grammar School in Warrington while continuing work on the translations.

== Translator and scholar in London ==
In the summer of 1770, Forster was invited to accompany the geographer Alexander Dalrymple on an East India Company expedition to Balambangan and planned to take George with him as a midshipman. The family moved to London in November 1770, but the plans fell through when Dalrymple was dismissed from the project in March 1771. Forster cultivated a friendship with the lawyer Daines Barrington, a close friend of Pennant and the vice president of the Society of Antiques and of the Royal Society. The translations begun in Warrington started to appear and were successful, with those of Kalm and Osbeck printed in a second edition. Forster additionally translated Jean Bernard Bossu's Travels through that part of America formerly called Louisiana. He published his own contributions to North American zoology and botany, A Catalogue of the Animals of North America and Florae Americae Septentrionalis; or a Catalogue of the Plants of North America. The Catalogue of the Animals, described by ornithologist Elsa Guerdrum Allen as "the first attempt to cover American fauna", contains a section with "Directions for Collecting, Preserving and Transporting all Kinds of Natural History Curiosities", a guide for field studies. In 1771, Forster started writing for The Critical Review, contributing reviews of foreign books. Commissioned by Thomas Davies, he started a translation of Louis Antoine de Bougainville's Voyage autour du monde, which appeared in 1772 as A Voyage Round the World. On 14 November 1771, Barrington and a number of Fellows of the Royal Society including Joseph Banks and David Solander endorsed Forster's nomination as a Fellow, leading to his election on 27 February 1772.

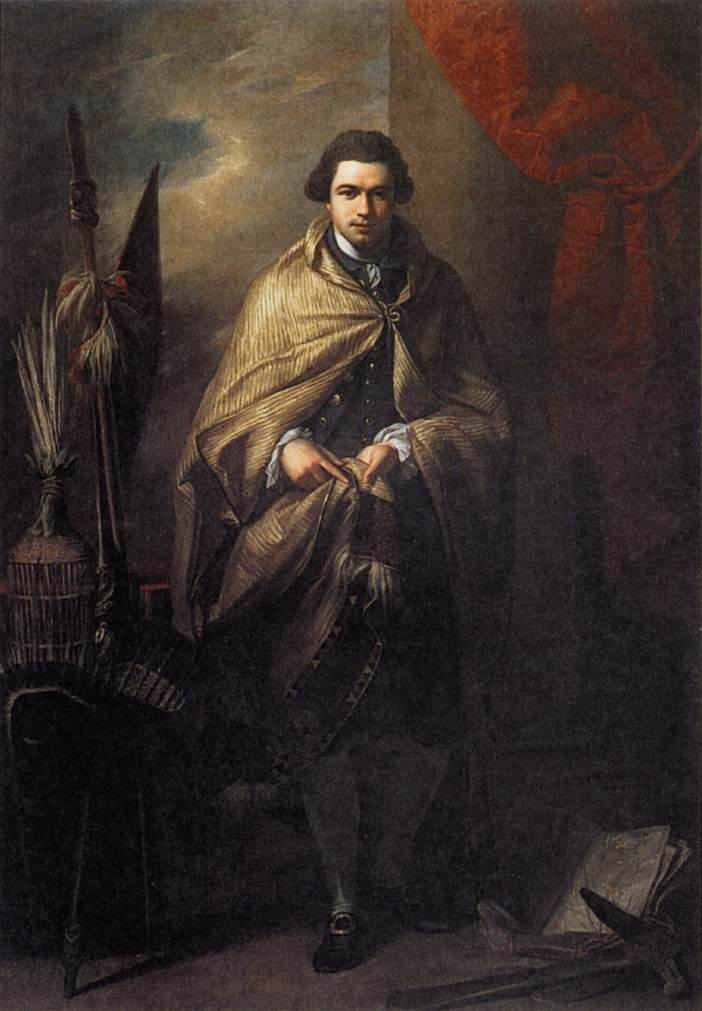
Joseph Banks painted by Benjamin West, 1773

Banks and Solander had returned to England in July 1771 from the first voyage of James Cook, and early plans for a second voyage started in August or September 1771. Forster attempted to ingratiate himself with Banks and Solander, for example by dedicating the Florae Americae Septentrionalis to Solander and directly suggested that he should accompany Banks on a further voyage when he dedicated his book Novae Species Insectorum to Banks. Cook was officially commissioned in November, and when Lord Sandwich, the First Lord of the Admiralty, approached Banks about taking part, he agreed and started assembling an expedition party including scientists and artists as well as musicians. Forster was not chosen by Banks, but they were in regular contact and had an amicable relationship.

== Appointment as naturalist for Cook's second voyage ==
On Banks's suggestions, significant changes were made to the expedition ship, HMS Resolution, to accommodate Banks's large entourage and their equipment. Alterations included an additional deck and a "roundhouse" on top for the captain, as Banks was to occupy the great cabin. This made the ship so top-heavy that it was deemed unsafe after a first trial at sea, and the additions were removed at Sheerness Dockyard. When Banks saw the refitted ship on 24 May 1772, he was furious and soon after announced he would not take part in the expedition. On 26 May, Forster received a visit from the naval surgeon and inventor Charles Irving, who, according to Forster's journal, "in a very mysterious manner told me, that Mr Banks did not go in the Resolution to the South Seas, & asked whether I would go". Forster accepted on the condition that his son George could accompany him as his assistant.

The English parliament had not long before voted to spend £4,000 for a scientist to accompany Cook on the voyage, which was intended to go to the Scottish physician and naturalist James Lind, whom Banks had chosen as a member of his party. Banks attempted to use his parliamentary contacts and to obtain an audience with the king to change the Admiralty's decision regarding the ship. Lord Sandwich obtained the king's approval for Forster's appointment. In a letter to the Prime Minister, Lord North, Sandwich asked him to support Forster, writing:

For these reasons I hope (if you have no objection of your own) that you will encourage Mr. Foster [sic] who from all hands is admitted to be one of the fittest persons in Europe for such an undertaking; he is ready to go at a moment's warning, is thoroughly satisfied of the safety of the ship and with her present accomodation, and having his son with him, who is a very able draughtsman and designer, will fully supply the chasm occasioned by Mr. Banks' having withdrawn himself from the voyage.

On 11 June 1772, the king authorised a payment of £1,795 to Forster from the civil list to prepare for the voyage, which was received on 17 June. After spending £1,500 on books and equipment, Forster went to Plymouth, where HMS Resolution arrived on 3 July.

== Voyage around the world ==
James Cook's chart of the Southern Hemisphere, showing some voyages of exploration including Cook's first and second voyages

Together with a second expedition ship, HMS Adventure, Resolution sailed from Plymouth on 13 July 1772. The first stop was the Portuguese island of Madeira, where Forster and his servant Ernst Scholient collected plants that were then drawn by George. In November 1772, the expedition spent three weeks in the Cape Colony in Southern Africa where Forster and the officers stayed with the trader Christoffel Brand. Forster met Anders Sparrman, a disciple of Linnaeus, and employed him as his scientific assistant for a salary of £50 per year plus expenses. From there they sailed south, making the first recorded crossing of the Antarctic Circle on 17 January 1773. They sailed to New Zealand and arrived in Tamatea / Dusky Sound on 27 March after four months at sea. They stayed there for five weeks; while Forster complained it was not a good season for proper botany, he managed to describe at least 19 birds as well as several fishes and plants. On an excursion, Forster found a lake that was later named "Lake Forster".

After a stay in Queen Charlotte Sound / Tōtaranui, they visited the Society Islands including Tahiti and the Friendly Islands (Tonga) between June and October 1773. After another tour to antarctic waters where the ship reached 71° 10′ southern latitude, a Farthest South record that stood for almost 50 years, they arrived at Easter Island in February 1774. The southern hemisphere winter was spent in Polynesia, and in October 1774 Cook sailed from New Zealand to Tierra del Fuego, where he started a third attempt to sail into the Antarctic. They returned to the Cape of Good Hope in March 1775 and finally to Plymouth, arriving there on 29 July 1775.

== Return to England, publications and controversies ==
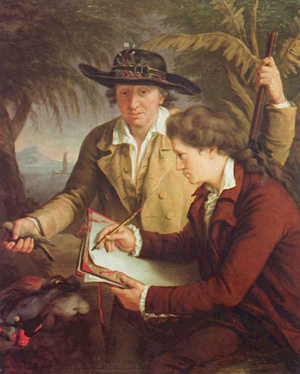
Johann Reinhold Forster and George Forster, by John Francis Rigaud, London 1780. The plant in the brim of the hat is a Forstera sedifolia and the bird in Reinhold Forster's hand a New Zealand bellbird.

After their return to London, Forster and his family moved to 16 Percy Street, St Pancras. He was received by King George III in August 1775 and presented some animal specimens to Queen Charlotte. Forster started to publish the scientific results of the voyage. The first publication was on botany, the book Characteres generum plantarum, which appeared in 1775/76. It had been prepared on board and was rushed to publication while containing numerous errors, as Forster saw himself in competition with Banks and hoped to claim the discoveries of plant species for himself.

In addition to the scientific publications, Forster also expected, based on promises made by Daines Barrington before the voyage, that he would write the official account of the voyage. The report of Cook's first voyage, An Account of the Voyages, had been compiled by John Hawkesworth for a compensation of £6,000. For the second voyage, Cook, who was dissatisfied with Hawkesworth's work, wanted to publish his own account. A compromise between Forster and Cook was negotiated by Lord Sandwich in April 1776. Cook was to write a first volume containing a narrative of the journey and the nautical observations, while Forster would contribute a second volume on natural history and ethnology. The British Admiralty would pay for engravings that were to be distributed between the two books. However, Forster's sample chapters did not satisfy Sandwich, who claimed they were a narrative instead of a scientific work and asked Richard Owen Cambridge to correct them. Forster found this unacceptable, proudly refused to submit any of his work for corrections and saw himself as the victim of a conspiracy.

After further attempts at compromise had failed due to Forster's obstinacy, Cook worked on his own narrative towards a separate publication. Forster's diaries were used by his son George, who was not bound by any contractual agreements, to write A Voyage Round the World, which appeared in March 1777, six weeks before Cook's A Voyage Towards the South Pole, and Round the World. Forster by then was writing his Observations Made During a Voyage Round the World containing the scientific and ethnological results of the voyage as a separate publication. Forster was spending lavishly and soon was in financial difficulties. The publication of A Voyage Round the World was unsuccessful financially; although the book had good reviews, it was outsold by Cook's book, which contained over sixty engravings. By late 1777, the book sales had not yet covered expenses and Forster was so deeply in debt that he was forced to sell some of his library to avoid debtor's prison. An important source of money for Forster was his fellow naturalist Banks: in 1776 and 1777, Banks bought drawings and books for almost £1,000 from Forster and additionally loaned him £200.

In 1778, William Wales, the astronomer on board the Resolution, published a Remarks on Mr Forster's Account of Captain Cook's last Voyage round the World, attacking Forster (whom he regarded as the true author of Voyage, dismissing George's authorship) and accused him of lies and misrepresentations. George Forster defended his father with a Reply to Mr Wales's Remarks containing some factual corrections as well as attacks on Wales and Sandwich. In June 1778, this was followed up by the Letter to the Right Honourable the Earl of Sandwich, which contained a further attack on Sandwich and his mistress, Martha Ray. After this publication, there was no more possibility of reconciliation with the Admiralty, and the Forsters worked on plans to move to Germany. The family moved to less pricey lodgings in the summer of 1778, and George travelled to Germany to obtain a position for his father, but only obtained a professorship of natural history at the Collegium Carolinum in Kassel for himself, which was insufficient to support his father's large family.

== Professor in Halle ==
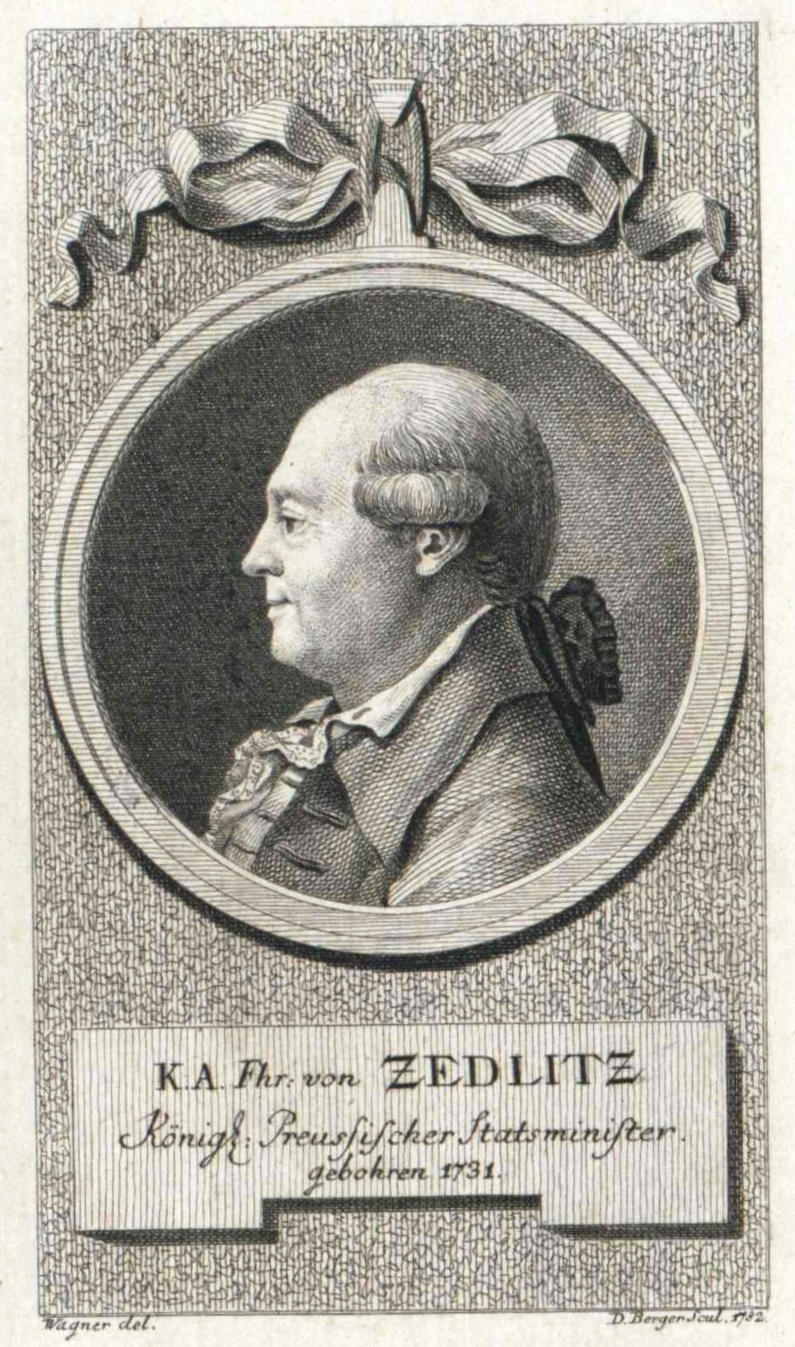
Karl Abraham von Zedlitz, engraving

In February 1779, Forster was appointed professor of natural history and mineralogy at the University of Halle by Karl Abraham von Zedlitz, the minister of education of the Kingdom of Prussia. The appointment was part of an attempt to raise the profile of the university and was supported by King Frederick the Great. A difficulty that needed to be overcome before Forster could take up the appointment was that his debts amounted to almost £800. George worked in Germany to secure money to help his father and family leave England, succeeding with the help of Duke Ferdinand of Brunswick-Wolfenbüttel and various Freemasons. The only remaining debt was owed to Banks, who did not pursue the matter at the time. In March 1780, Forster's paper on penguins was presented by Johann Friedrich Gmelin at the Göttingen Academy of Sciences; it appeared in 1781 and was later described as his "definite treatise" on the penguins. Forster and his family left London for Germany in July 1780. On his way to Halle, Forster spent some time in Berlin, where he was granted an audience with the king, who gave him the title of Geheimrat, approved an increase of his salary in Halle and supported his travel expenses.

In September 1780, Forster was introduced to the Senate of the University. To make up for his lack of teaching credentials, he was given an honorary degree with the title of Doctor of Philosophy honoris causa. He was made responsible for the university's botanical garden, which was run by Philipp Kaspar Junghans who was employed as demonstrator in botany. When Forster's supervision ended in 1788, he had added (in his own estimation) 2700 plants to the garden by using his international connections, for example those to Carl Peter Thunberg in Uppsala and William Aiton at Kew.

Forster was made professor of medicine and received the degree of Doctor of Medicine, also honoris causa, in 1781. He lectured on natural history, based on his own research, an approach that was unpopular with the students. Possibly influenced by his son-in-law Matthias Christian Sprengel, Forster began to teach universal history, geography and statistics using more established teaching texts. Student attendance was higher when he lectured in agriculture, and Forster started publishing essays on cultivation, husbandry and general technology. He also taught mineralogy from the works of August Ferdinand von Veltheim and translated Tiberius Cavallo's mineralogical tables into German. The first edition of 750 copies sold completely and Forster followed it up with an improved second edition. In 1784, he published a work on the exploration of the Arctic, which was translated to English in 1786 as History of the Voyages and Discoveries in the North. An attack on Barrington was removed for the English version. In 1790, Forster was elected pro-rector of the University; his responsibilities included student discipline. He started editing a journal of travel literature, the Magazin von neuen merkwürdigen Reisebeschreibungen (Magazine of new curious travel descriptions). Although Forster was by 1790 one of the most well-paid academics at Halle and had additional income from his books, he was often in financial difficulties as he spent his money amassing an extensive library with a special focus on maps and travel literature.

Meanwhile, George had become the university librarian in Mainz in 1788. After the city had been captured by French revolutionary troops in 1792, George became a member of the Mainz Jacobin Club and a leading person of the Republic of Mainz. He was sent to Paris as a delegate in 1793 and petitioned for the accession of Mainz into the French First Republic; for this, he was considered a traitor in Germany. George died in Paris on 10 January 1794. Forster then wrote a biographical account of his son that was published in the Philosophischer Anzeiger.

== Death and legacy ==
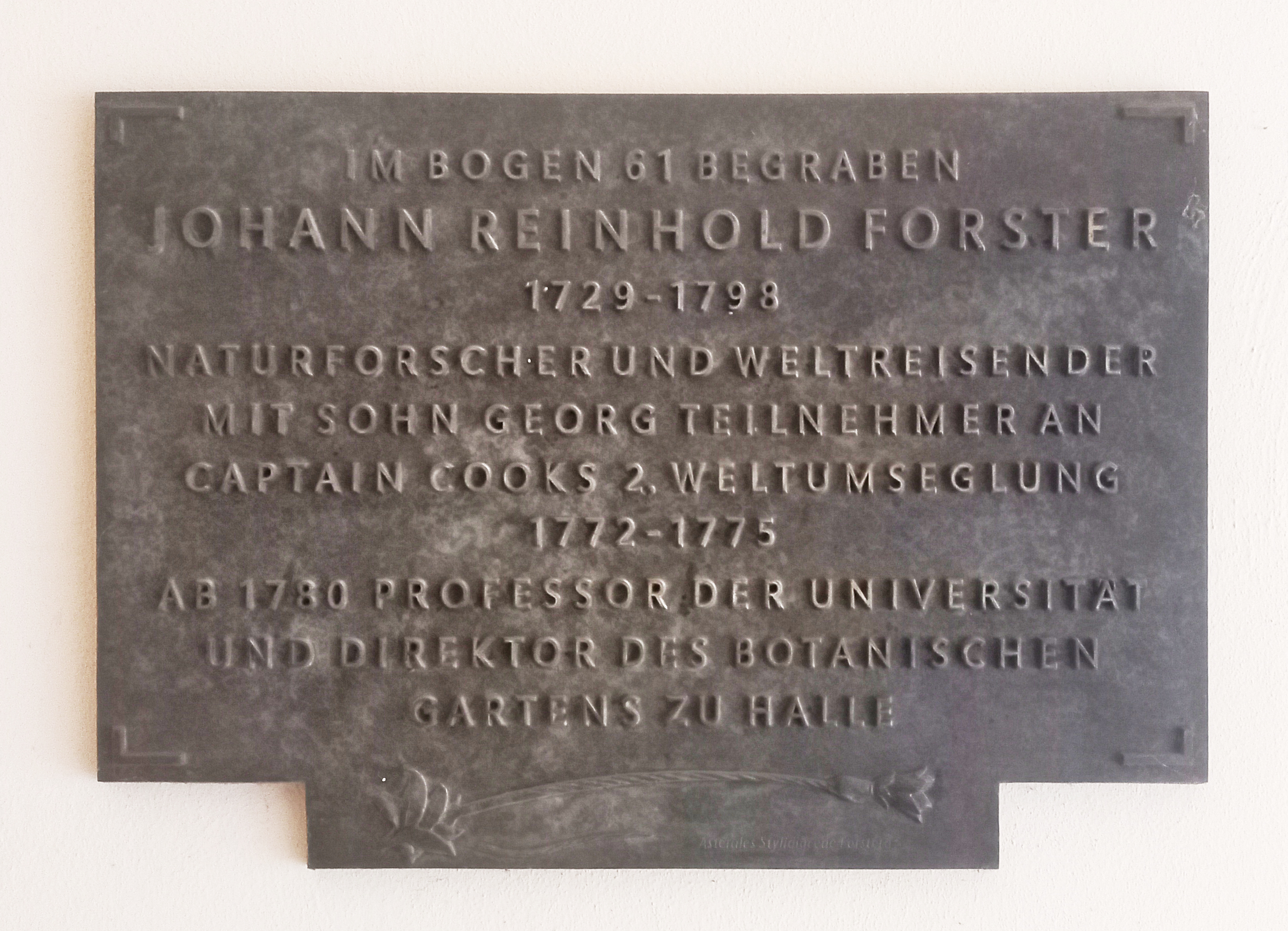
Memorial for Forster's tomb

On 9 December 1798, Forster died from an aortic aneurysm after suffering from angina. He was buried in arcade number 61 of the municipal Stadtgottesacker cemetery. A memorial plaque for Forster was installed there on 7 May 2016.

After Forster's death, Banks forgave his widow the remaining debt of £250. The extensive library and the manuscripts were bought by the Prussian royal library for 8,000 Taler. (Note: For comparison, a journeyman craftsman in Northern Germany had an annual salary of about 105–130 Taler.) Forster's collection of Pacific artefacts was sold to the Hanoverian government for 80 Taler after negotiations led by Johann Friedrich Blumenbach; it now forms part of the University of Göttingen's ethnological collections.

Forster has been generally overshadowed by his more famous son. This is especially true in Germany, where George Forster was rediscovered by East German historians and studied as an early German democrat. However, the Forsters were often seen as a symbiotic unit, especially for some of their work in the natural sciences. In English-language scholarship concerned with the voyages of James Cook, the focus was for a long time on the elder Forster's difficult character; (Note: His shipmate John Elliot had summarised Forster as "a clever but a litigious quarelsom fellow". The literary scholar Philip Edwards later described Forster's character as "prickly, cantankerous, irascible, obstinate, suspicious of slights to the point of paranoia, resentful, self-important and self-protective".) his achievements and abilities were downplayed or ignored. The botanist Elmer Drew Merrill accused Forster of plagiarising the work of Solander, but his arguments were later refuted by fellow botanists Dan Henry Nicolson and Francis Raymond Fosberg. The Cook scholar John Beaglehole introduced Forster as "one of the awkward beings of the age" and called him "one of the Admiralty's vast mistakes". Beaglehole attacked Forster at every opportunity in his edition of Cook's journals, which the literary scholar Philip Edwards described as "petty persecution".

Modern study of Forster has resulted in a reassessment of his contributions, especially after the publication of Michael Hoare's Forster biography The Tactless Philosopher and Hoare's edition of Forster's journals from the voyage. The Australian art historian Bernard Smith called Forster a "pioneer of social anthropology" in 1985, and Observations was described after the publication of a scholarly edition in 1996 as "the beginning of modern geography" by geographer David Stoddart and "one of the most important early examinations of the new Pacific archive" by anthropologist K. R. Howe.

Forster is commemorated by the plant genus Forstera, which is considered to have been named by Linnaeus. Its description, probably due to Sparrman and under the name "Forsteria", was sent to Linnaeus by Forster in a letter and first published by George Forster in 1780. The genus Forsterygion of triplefin fishes in New Zealand is named after Forster, who had described Forsterygion varium. Several other taxa were named in his honour, for example the emperor penguin (Aptenodytes forsteri), Forster's tern (Sterna forsteri) and various plants.

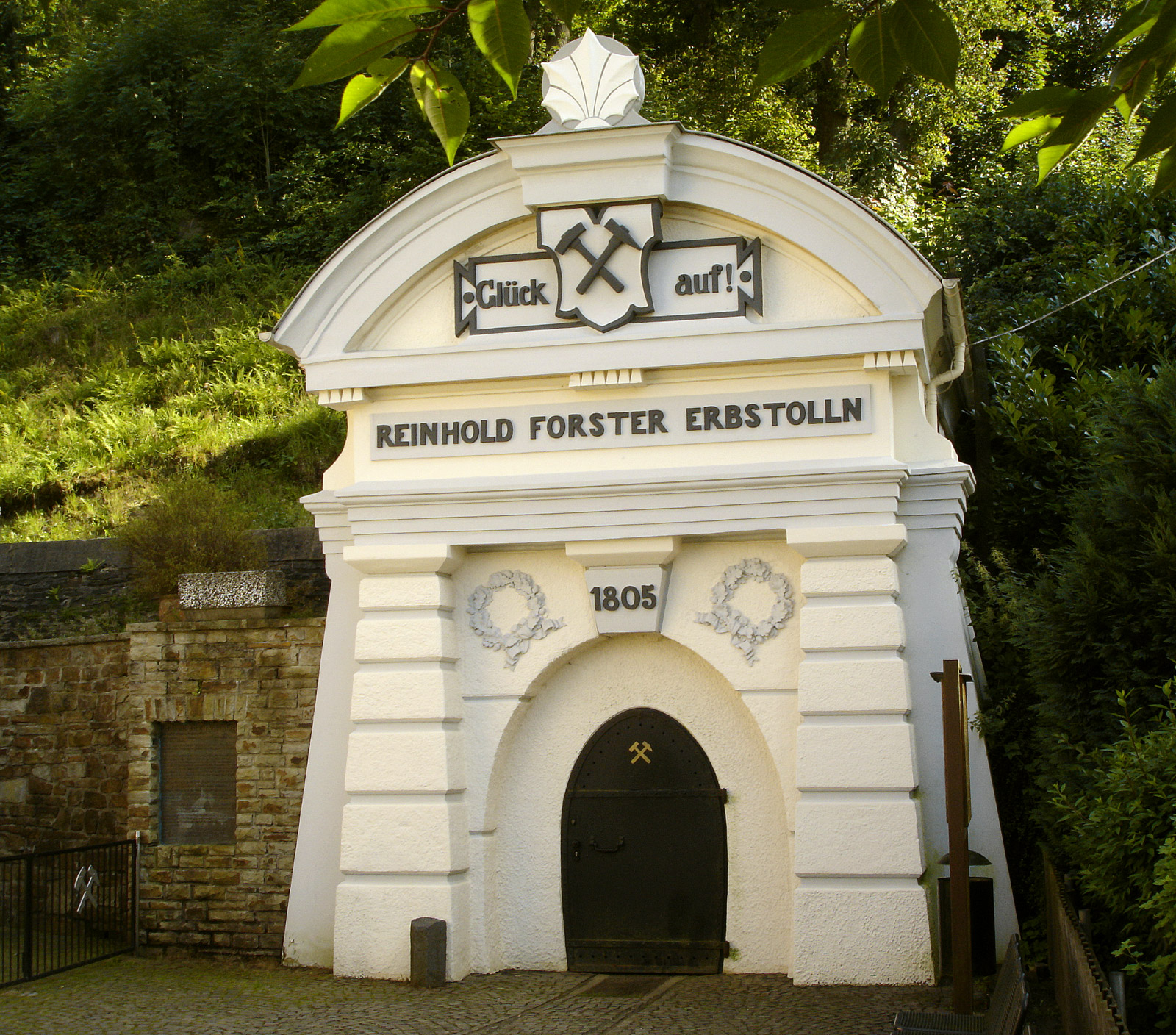
Entrance to Reinhold Forster Erbstolln, an exhibition mine in Siegen, Germany

Geographic features named after Forster include Lake Forster and Mount Forster in Fiordland, New Zealand, and Forsters Passage in the South Sandwich Islands. Also named for Forster, the Reinhold-Forster-Erbstollen, is an 1805 drainage tunnel for an iron ore mine close to Siegen, Germany, that has been converted to an exhibition mine in 1983.

== Selected works ==
A complete bibliography can be found in the biography of Michael Hoare.

- Forster, Johann Reinhold (1 January 1767). "XXXIII. Specimen historiae naturalis volgensis" [Specimen of the natural history of the Volga region]. Philosophical Transactions of the Royal Society of London (in Latin). 57: 312–357.
- Forster, John Reinhold (1768). An introduction to mineralogy: or, an accurate classification of fossils and minerals. London: J. Johnson and T. Cadell.
- Forster, Johann Reinhold (1770). A catalogue of British insects. Warrington: William Eyres.
- Forster, John Reinhold (1771). A catalogue of the animals of North America. London: B. White.
- Forster, Johann Reinhold (1771). Flora Americae Septentrionalis: Or, A Catalogue of the Plants of North America : Containing an Enumeration of the Known Herbs, Shrubs, and Trees, Many of which are But Lately Discovered : Together with Their English Names, the Places where They Grow, Their Different Uses, and the Authors who Have Described and Figured Them. London: B. White and T. Davies.
- Forster, Johann Reinhold (1771). Novæ species insectorum [New species of insects] (in Latin). London: T. Davies and B. White.
- Forster, Joannes Reinoldus; Forster, Georgius (1776). Characteres generum plantarum, quas in itinere ad insulas maris Australis, collegerunt, descripserunt, delinearunt, annis MDCCLXXII-MDCCLXXV [Characters of the plant genera that were collected, described and drawn in 1772–175 during a voyage to the South Seas]. London: B. White, T. Cadell, & P. Elmsly.
- Forster, Johann Reinhold (1778). Observations made during a voyage round the world [in H.M.S. Resolution] on physical geography, natural history, and ethic philosophy. Vol. 1778. London: G. Robinson.
- Forster, Ioannes Reinoldus (1781). "Historia aptenodytae" [History of the penguins]. Commentationes Societatis Regiae Scientiarum Gottingensis (in Latin). 3. Göttingen: H. Dieterich.
- Forster, Johann Reinhold (1788). Enchiridion historiae naturali inserviens, quo termini et delineationes ad avium, piscium, insectorum et plantarum adumbrationes intelligendas et concinnandas, secundum methodum systematis Linnaeani continentur [Handbook of natural history containing terms and drawings to understand birds, insects and plants according to the Linnaean system] (in Latin). Halle: Hemmerde and Schwetschke.
- Forster, Johann Reinhold (1844). Lichtenstein, Hinrich (ed.). Descriptiones animalium quae in itinere ad Maris Australis terras per annos 1772, 1773 et 1774 suscepto [Descriptions of the animals I saw in a voyage to the lands of the South Seas in the years 1772, 1773 and 1774] (in Latin). Berlin: Ex Officina Academica.

== See also ==
- Category:Taxa named by Johann Reinhold Forster

== Sources ==
- Allen, Elsa Guerdrum (1951). "The history of American ornithology before Audubon". Transactions of the American Philosophical Society. 41 (3): 387–591. Bibcode:1951TAPS...41..387A. doi:10.2307/1005629. ISSN 0065-9746. JSTOR 1005629.
- Beaglehole, John C. (1962a). The Endeavour Journal of Joseph Banks 1768–1771. Vol. 1. Sydney: Trustees of Public Library of N.S.W. in association with Angus and Robertson. OCLC 222980498.
- Beaglehole, John C. (1962b). The Endeavour Journal of Joseph Banks 1768–1771. Vol. 2. Sydney: Trustees of Public Library of N.S.W. in association with Angus and Robertson. OCLC 686620387.
- Beaglehole, John C. (1974). The Life of Captain James Cook. London: Adam & Charles Black. OCLC 480115019.
- Beaglehole, John C. (1969) [1961]. The Journals of Captain James Cook on his Voyages of Discovery. Vol. II. Cambridge: Published for the Hakluyt Society at the University Press. OCLC 1052665808.
- Begg, A. Charles; Begg, Neil C. (1966). Dusky Bay. New York: Barnes & Noble. OCLC 13538.
- Beolens, Bo; Watkins, Michael; Grayson, Michael (19 March 2020). The Eponym Dictionary of Birds. London: Bloomsbury Publishing. ISBN 978-1-4729-8269-8.
- Blanning, T. C. W. (1974). Reform and revolution in Mainz, 1743-1803. London; New York: Cambridge University Press. ISBN 978-0-521-20418-7.
- Dawson, Ruth (1973). Georg Forster's Reise um die Welt. A Travelogue in its Eighteenth-Century Context (PhD thesis). University of Michigan. OCLC 65229601.
- Dove, Alfred (1877). "Forster, Reinhold" . Allgemeine Deutsche Biographie (in German). Vol. 7. Leipzig: Duncker & Humblot. pp. 166–172.
- Earp, C. (1 December 2013). "The date of publication of the Forsters' Characteres Generum Plantarum revisited". New Zealand Journal of Botany. 51 (4): 252–263. Bibcode:2013NZJB...51..252E. doi:10.1080/0028825X.2013.806935. ISSN 0028-825X. S2CID 85352282.
- Easterby-Smith, Sarah (2017). Cultivating Commerce: Cultures of Botany in Britain and France, 1760–1815. Science in History. Cambridge: Cambridge University Press. doi:10.1017/9781316411339.004. ISBN 978-1-107-12684-8.
- Edwards, Philip (1994). The Story of the Voyage: Sea-Narratives in Eighteenth-Century England. Cambridge: Cambridge University Press. ISBN 978-0-521-60426-0.
- Eyles, Victor (1969). The extent of geological knowledge in the eighteenth century, and the methods by which it was diffused. New Hampshire Inter-disciplinary Conference on the History of Geology (1967 : Rye Beach). Toward a history of geology. Cambridge: M.I.T. Press. pp. 159–183. ISBN 978-0-262-19058-9.
- Gordon, Joseph Stuart (1975). Reinhold and Georg Forster in England, 1766-1780 (PhD thesis). Ann Arbor: Duke University. OCLC 732713365.
- Hince, Bernadette (2021). "Forster, Johann Reinhold". Dictionary of Falklands Biography.
- Hoare, Michael Edward (1967). "Johann Reinhold Forster: The neglected 'philosopher' of Cook's second voyage (1772–1775)". The Journal of Pacific History. 2: 215–224. doi:10.1080/00223346708572117. ISSN 0022-3344. JSTOR 25167919.
- Hoare, Michael Edward (1976). The Tactless Philosopher: Johann Reinhold Forster (1729-98). Melbourne: Hawthorne Press. ISBN 9780725601218.
- Hoare, Michael Edward (1982). The Resolution Journal of Johann Reinhold Forster, 1772–1775. London: Hakluyt Society. ISBN 978-0-904180-10-7.
- Hoare, Michael Edward (1994). "Die beiden Forster und die pazifische Wissenschaft" [The Two Forsters and Pacific Science]. In Klenke, Claus-Volker (ed.). Georg Forster in interdisziplinärer Perspektive. Georg Forster in interdisziplinärer Perspektive: Beiträge des Internationalen Georg-Forster-Symposions in Kassel, 1. bis 4. April 1993 (in German). Translated by Klenke, Claus-Volker. Berlin: Akademie Verlag. pp. 29–42. doi:10.1515/9783050070315-006. ISBN 978-3-05-007031-5.
- Howe, K. R. (2003). The Quest for Origins: Who first Discovered and Settled the Pacific Islands?. Honolulu: University of Hawaiʻi Press. ISBN 978-0-8248-2750-2.
- Koop, Irmtraut (October 2016). "The CCS in Germany, May 2016". Cook's Log. 39 (4). Captain Cook Society: 39–43.
- Kümmel, Fritz (1973). "Zur Geschichte des Botanischen Gartens der Martin-Luther-Universität Halle-Wittenberg in Halle im Zeitraum von 1698 bis 1817" [On the history of the botanical garden of Martin Luther University Halle-Wittenberg from 1698 to 1817]. Hercynia (in German). 10: 366–393.
- MacGregor, Arthur (2015). "Five unpublished manuscripts of Johann Reinhold Forster (1729–1798) in the archives of the Linnean Society of London". Archives of Natural History. 42 (2): 314–330. doi:10.3366/anh.2015.0315. ISSN 0260-9541.
- Mahlke, Regina; Weiß, Ruth (1998). Faszination Forschung: Johann Reinhold Forster (1729-1798) [Fascination Research: Johann Reinhold Forster (1729–1798)]. Staatsbibliothek zu Berlin—Preußischer Kulturbesitz. Ausstellungskataloge, Neue Folge (in German). Vol. 31. Wiesbaden: Ludwig Reichert Verlag. ISBN 978-3-89500-096-6. OCLC 231767346.
- Mariss, Anne (10 December 2015). A world of new things: Praktiken der Naturgeschichte bei Johann Reinhold Forster (in German). Frankfurt; New York: Campus Verlag. ISBN 978-3-593-50477-3.
- Mariss, Anne (9 September 2019). Johann Reinhold Forster and the Making of Natural History on Cook's Second Voyage, 1772–1775. Lanham: Rowman & Littlefield. ISBN 978-1-4985-5615-6.
- McDowall, R. M. (2010). New Zealand Freshwater Fishes: An Historical and Ecological Biogeography. Fish and Fisheries. Dordrecht: Springer Netherlands. doi:10.1007/978-90-481-9271-7. ISBN 978-90-481-9270-0.
- Mironov, Boris N. (2010). "Wages and prices in Imperial Russia, 1703-1913". The Russian Review. 69 (1): 47–72. doi:10.1111/j.1467-9434.2010.00554.x. ISSN 0036-0341. JSTOR 20621167.
- National Portrait Gallery. "Portrait of Dr Johann Reinhold Forster and his son George Forster, c. 1780". National Portrait Gallery collection.
- Nicolson, Dan H; Fosberg, F. Raymond (2004). The Forsters and the Botany of the Second Cook Expedition (1772–1775). Ruggell, Liechtenstein; Königstein, Germany: A.R.G. Gantner Verlag; distributed by Koeltz Scientific Books. ISBN 978-3-906166-02-5. OCLC 55731186.
- Pantenius, Michael (2021). Johann Reinhold Forster. Von Tahiti an die Saale (in German). Halle: Hasenverlag. ISBN 978-3-945377-78-9. OCLC 1282186844.
- Rosove, Michael H. (13 March 2018). "Who discovered the emperor penguin? A historical survey from James Cook to Robert F. Scott". Polar Record. 54 (1): 43–52. Bibcode:2018PoRec..54...43R. doi:10.1017/S0032247418000104. ISSN 0032-2474.
- Schmidt-Liebich, Jochen (20 April 2011). "Geldwesen und Lebenshaltungskosten" [Monetary system and cost of living]. Lexikon der Künstlerinnen 1700-1900. Lexikon der Künstlerinnen 1700–1900: Deutschland, Österreich, Schweiz (in German). München: De Gruyter Saur. pp. 547–550. doi:10.1515/9783110951370.547. ISBN 978-3-11-095137-0.
- Smith, Bernard (1985). European Vision and the South Pacific. New Haven: Yale University Press. ISBN 978-0-300-02815-7.
- Stearn, William T. (1 April 1978). "The botanical results of Captain Cook's three voyages and their later influence". Pacific Studies. 1: 147–162.
- Steiner, Gerhard (1968). "Johann Reinhold Forsters und Georg Forsters Beziehungen zu Rußland" [Johann Reinhold Forster's and Georg Forster's relations with Russia]. In Graßhoff, Helmut; Lehmann, Ulf (eds.). Studien zur Geschichte der russischen Literatur des 18. Jahrhunderts [Studies in the History of Russian Literature]. Vol. 2. Berlin: Akademie-Verlag. pp. 245–311, 430–450. OCLC 174778052.
- Stoddart, David R. (1996). "A learned, intelligent, and judicious traveller". Geographical Review. 86 (4): 604–610. doi:10.2307/215935. ISSN 0016-7428. JSTOR 215935.
- Thomas, Nicholas; Berghof, Oliver (2000). Introduction. A Voyage Round the World. By Forster, George. Thomas, Nicholas; Berghof, Oliver (eds.). Honolulu: University of Hawai'i Press. pp. xix–xliii. ISBN 978-0-8248-6130-8. OCLC 70765538.
- Uhlig, Ludwig (2004). Georg Forster: Lebensabenteuer eines gelehrten Weltbürgers (1754–1794) [Georg Forster: Life Adventures of a Scholarly World Citizen] (in German). Göttingen: Vandenhoeck & Ruprecht. ISBN 9783525367315.
- Williams, Glyn (22 October 2013). Naturalists at Sea: Scientific Travellers from Dampier to Darwin. New Haven: Yale University Press. ISBN 978-0-300-18073-2.
- Wystrach, V. P. (May 1977). "Anna Blackburne (1726-1793)–a neglected patroness of natural history". Journal of the Society for the Bibliography of Natural History. 8 (2): 148–168. doi:10.3366/jsbnh.1977.8.2.148. ISSN 0037-9778.
