= Georg Forster =

German naturalist, ethnologist, travel writer, journalist, and revolutionary (1754-1794)

Georg Forster FRS
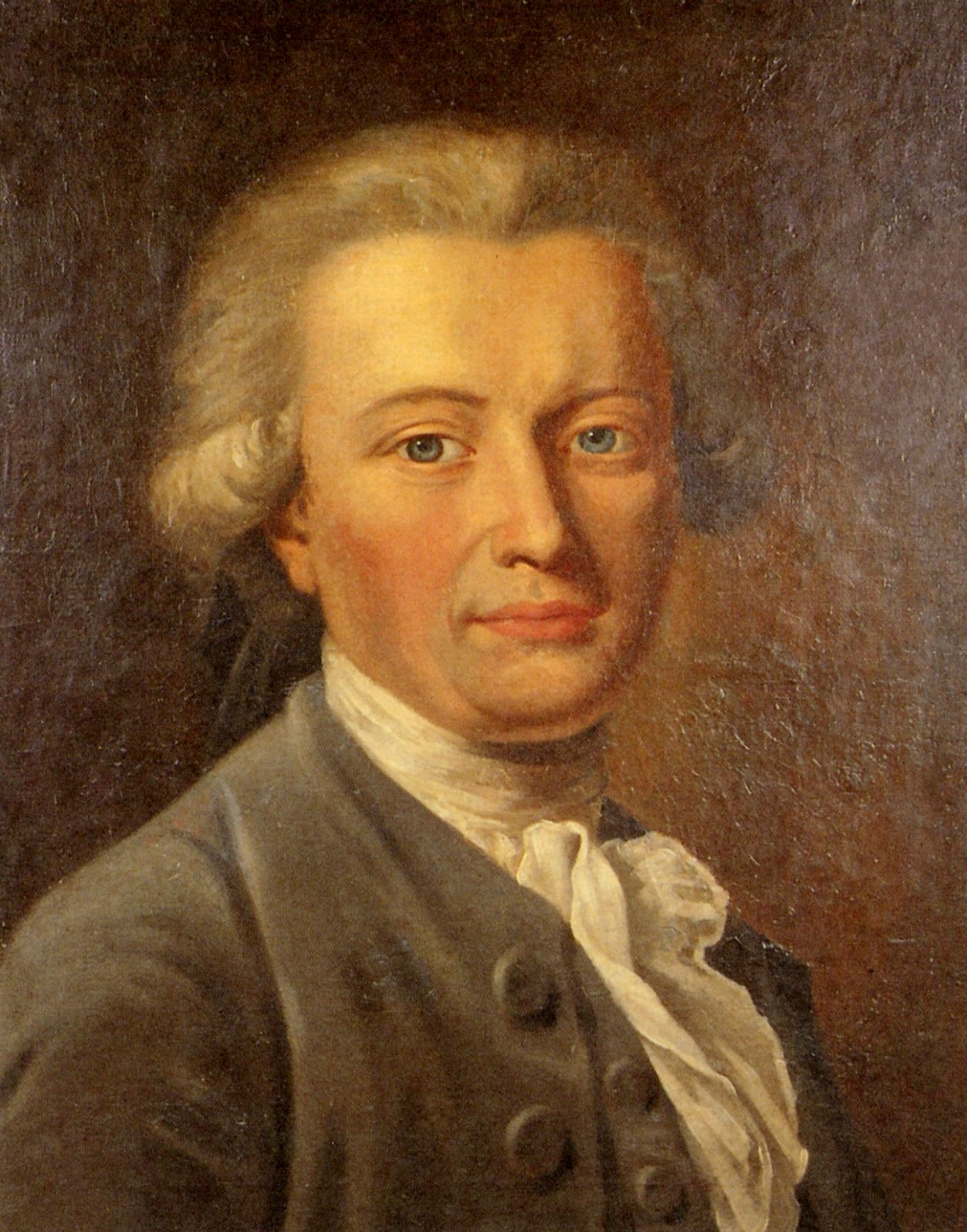
- Georg Forster in 1781, age 26
- Born: Johann George Adam Forster; 27 November 1754; Nassenhuben, Pomeranian Voivodeship, Crown of the Kingdom of Poland
- Died: 10 January 1794 (aged 39); Paris, French Republic
- Education: Saint Peter's School (Saint Petersburg), Warrington Academy
- Known for: Founding modern travel literature
- Spouse: Therese Heyne
- Children: Therese Forster; Claire von Greyerz
- Parent(s): Johann Reinhold Forster and Justina Elisabeth, née Nicolai
- Scientific career
- Fields: natural history, ethnology
- Workplaces: Vilnius University, University of Mainz, Collegium Carolinum (Kassel)
- Patrons: Catherine the Great
- Author abbrev. (botany): G.Forst.

Johann George Adam Forster, also known as Georg Forster (Note: Forster was baptised "Johann George Adam Forster", with the English spelling "George", widely used in the Danzig area at the time, possibly chosen commemorating the family's ancestors from Yorkshire. The German form of his name is also common in English (for example, Thomas P. Saine's English-language biography is titled "Georg Forster"), which helps to distinguish him from George Forster, a contemporaneous English traveller.) (German: [ˈɡeːɔʁk ˈfɔʁstɐ]; 27 November 1754 – 10 January 1794), was a German geographer, naturalist, ethnologist, travel writer, journalist and revolutionary. At an early age, he accompanied his father, Johann Reinhold Forster, on several scientific expeditions, including James Cook's second voyage to the Pacific. His report of that journey, A Voyage Round the World, contributed significantly to the ethnology of the people of Polynesia and remains a respected work. As a result of the report, Forster, who was admitted to the Royal Society at the early age of twenty-two, came to be considered one of the founders of modern scientific travel literature.

After returning to continental Europe, Forster turned toward academia. He taught natural history at the Collegium Carolinum in the Ottoneum, Kassel (1778–84), and later at the Academy of Vilna (Vilnius University) (1784–87). In 1788, he became head librarian at the University of Mainz. Most of his scientific work during this time consisted of essays on botany and ethnology, but he also prefaced and translated many books about travel and exploration, including a German translation of Cook's diaries.

Forster was a central figure of the Enlightenment in Germany, and corresponded with most of its adherents, including his close friend Georg Christoph Lichtenberg. His ideas, travelogues and personality influenced Alexander von Humboldt, one of the great scientists of the 19th century who hailed Forster as the founder of both comparative ethnology (Völkerkunde) and regional geography (Länderkunde). When the French took control of Mainz in 1792, Forster played a leading role in the Mainz Republic, the earliest republican state in Germany. During July 1793 and while he was in Paris as a delegate of the young Mainz Republic, Prussian and Austrian coalition forces regained control of the city and Forster was declared an outlaw. Unable to return to Germany and separated from his friends and family, he died in Paris of illness in early 1794, not yet 40.

The standard author abbreviation G.Forst. is used to indicate this person as the author when citing a botanical name.

== Early life ==
Georg Forster was born in Nassenhuben (Note: Some sources indicate that the birth took place in the rectory of Hochzeit, a village very close to Nassenhuben on the other side of the Motława river.) (now Mokry Dwór, Poland), a small village near Danzig, on 27 November 1754. (Note: Some variants of the date of birth exist in the literature, with 26 November common in earlier literature. The baptism registries of Nassenhuben and of St Peter and Paul, Gdańsk list 27 November as date of birth and 5 December as date of baptism. The date of 27 November is claimed by both father and son; for example, Reinhold's diary entry for 27 November 1772 starts "This day was George's birthday & we were all very happy.") Georg was the oldest of seven surviving children of Johann Reinhold Forster, a Reformed Protestant pastor and scholar, and his wife Justina Elisabeth, née Nicolai. From an early age, Georg was interested in the study of nature, and his father first learned natural history from the books of Carl Linnaeus and then taught his son biology as well as Latin, French, and religion. In 1765, Reinhold obtained a commission by the Russian government to inspect the recently founded colonies near Saratov on the Volga River, which were mostly settled by German colonists. Ten-year old Georg accompanied his father on the 4,000 km (2,500 mi) journey, which reached the Kalmyk Steppe and Lake Elton, and collected hundreds of specimens of plants, helping his father with naming and identification. From October 1765, he attended Saint Peter's School in St Petersburg, while his father prepared a report about the state of the colony. Reinhold's report was critical of the voivode of Saratov and of the conditions in the colony, and the Forsters left Russia without payment amidst quarrel with Grigory Orlov. After a sea journey from Kronstadt, during which Georg learned English and practiced Russian, they arrived in London on 4 October 1766. Twelve-year old Georg competently translated Lomonosov's history of Russia into English and continued it until the present, and the printed book was presented to the Society of Antiquaries on 21 May 1767. His father took up a teaching position at Warrington Academy in June 1767, succeeding Joseph Priestley, leaving Georg behind in London as apprentice with a London merchant until the rest of the family arrived in England in September 1767. In Warrington, Georg learned classics and religion from John Aikin, mathematics from John Holt and French and natural history from his father.

== Around the world with Captain Cook ==
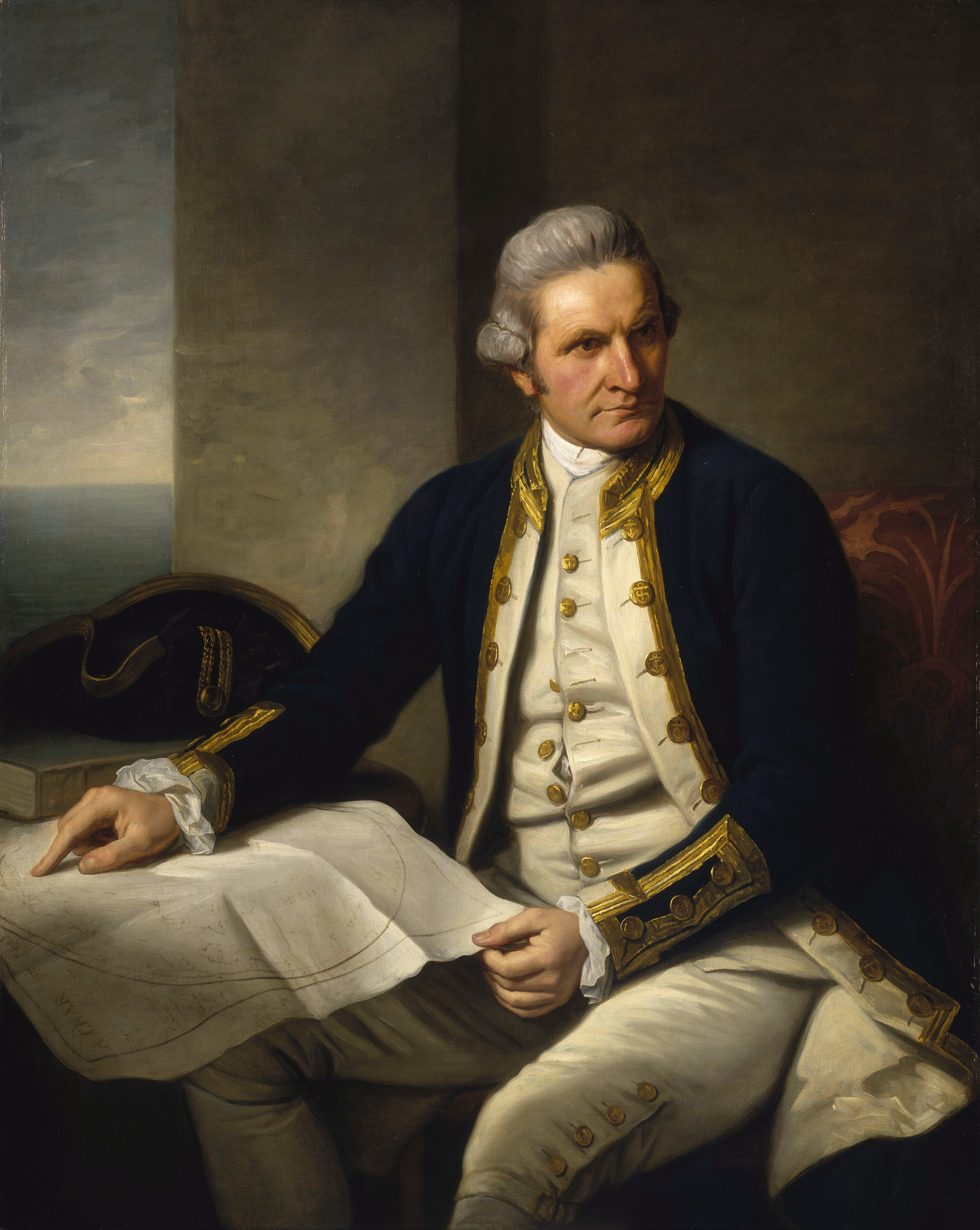
James Cook, portrait by Nathaniel Dance, c. 1775, National Maritime Museum, Greenwich

The Forsters moved back to London in 1770, where Reinhold Forster cultivated scientific contacts and became a member of the Royal Society in 1772. After the withdrawal of Joseph Banks, he was invited by the British Admiralty to join James Cook's second expedition to the Pacific (1772–75). Georg Forster joined his father in the expedition again and was appointed as a draughtsman to his father. Johann Reinhold Forster's task was to work on a scientific report of the journey's discoveries that was to be published after their return.

They embarked HMS Resolution on 13 July 1772, in Plymouth. The ship's route led first to the South Atlantic, then through the Indian Ocean and the Southern Ocean to the islands of Polynesia and finally around Cape Horn back to England, returning on 30 July 1775. During the three-year journey, the explorers visited New Zealand, the Tonga islands, New Caledonia, Tahiti, the Marquesas Islands and Easter Island. They went further south than anybody before them, almost discovering Antarctica. The journey conclusively disproved the Terra Australis Incognita theory, which claimed there was a big, habitable continent in the South.

Supervised by his father, Georg Forster first undertook studies of the zoology and botanics of the southern seas, mostly by drawing animals and plants. However, Georg also pursued his own interests, which led to completely independent explorations in comparative geography and ethnology. He quickly learned the languages of the Polynesian islands. His reports on the people of Polynesia are well regarded today, as they describe the inhabitants of the southern islands with empathy, sympathy and largely without Western bias.

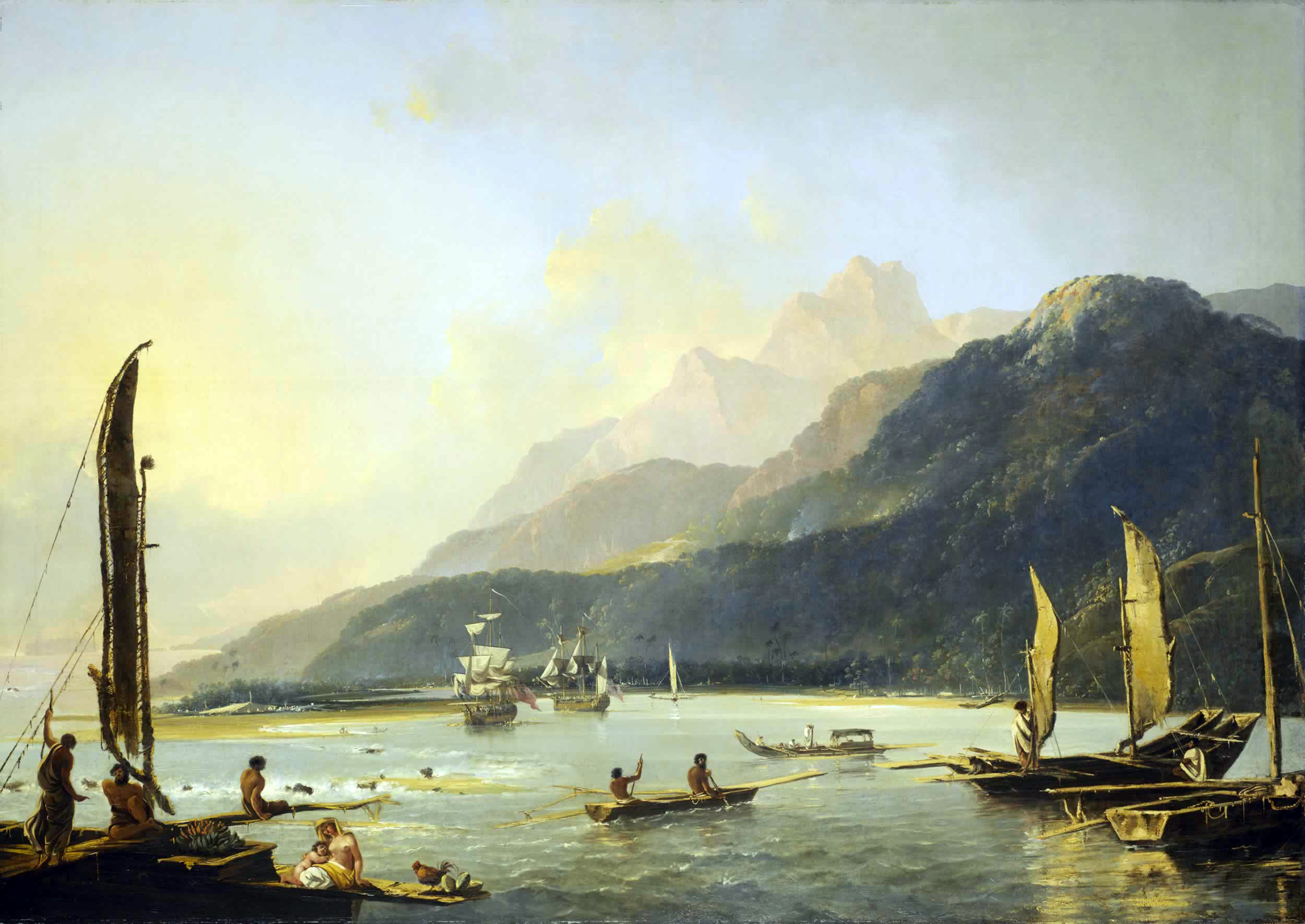
Resolution and Adventure in Matavai Bay by William Hodges

Unlike Louis Antoine de Bougainville, whose reports from a journey to Tahiti a few years earlier had initiated uncritical noble savage romanticism, Forster developed a sophisticated picture of the societies of the South Pacific islands. He described various social structures and religions that he encountered on the Society Islands, Easter Island and in Tonga and New Zealand, and ascribed this diversity to the difference in living conditions of these people. At the same time, he also observed that the languages of these fairly widely scattered islands were similar. About the inhabitants of the Nomuka islands (in the Ha'apai island group of present-day Tonga), he wrote that their languages, vehicles, weapons, furniture, clothes, tattoos, style of beard, in short all of their being matched perfectly with what he had already seen while studying tribes on Tongatapu. However, he wrote, "we could not observe any subordination among them, though this had strongly characterised the natives of Tonga-Tabboo, who seemed to descend even to servility in their obeisance to the king."

The journey was rich in scientific results. However, the relationship between the Forsters and Cook and his officers was often problematic, due to the elder Forster's fractious temperament as well as Cook's refusal to allow more time for botanical and other scientific observation. Cook refused scientists on his third journey after his experiences with the Forsters.

== Founder of modern travel literature ==
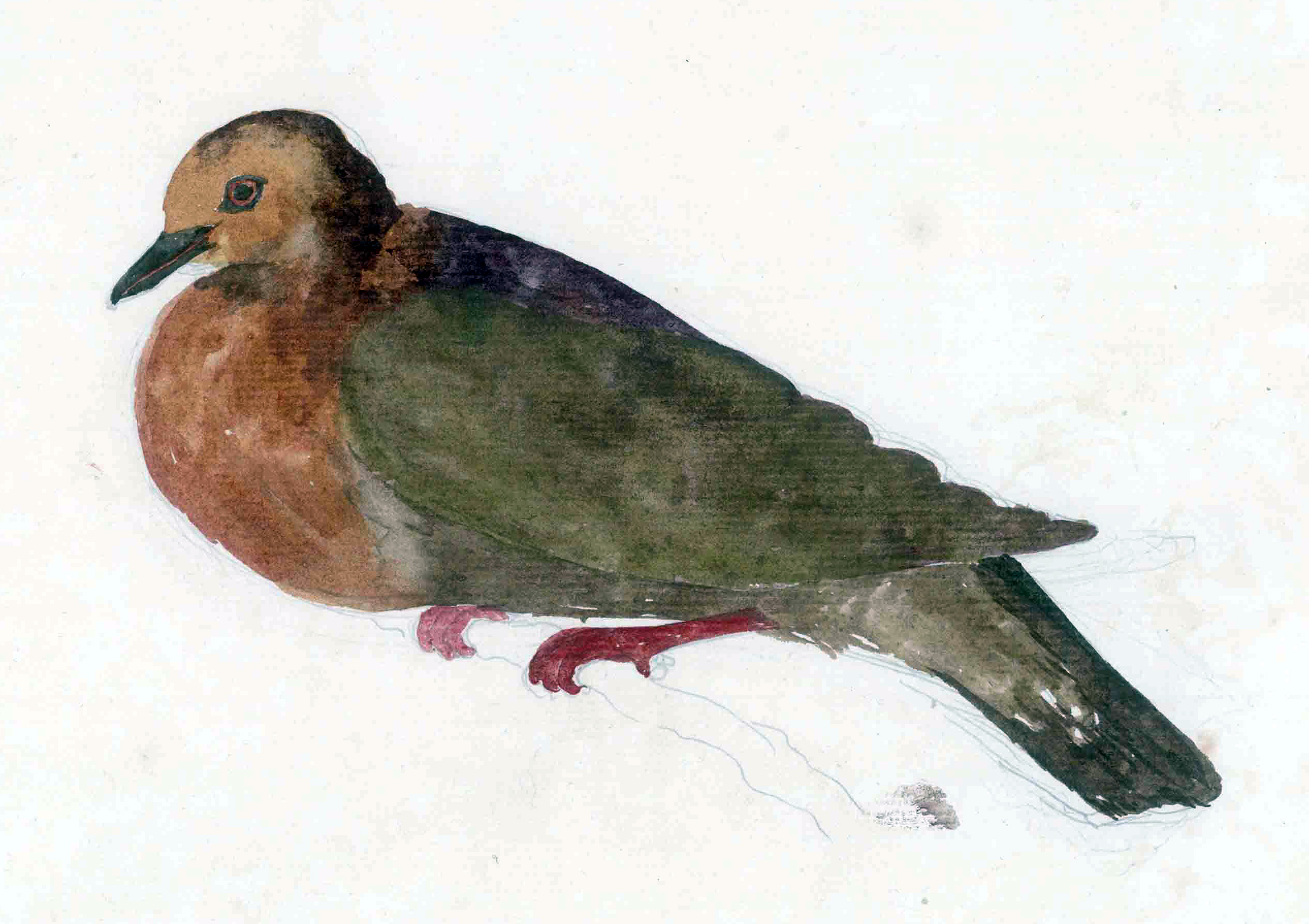
One of Forster's many illustrations of birds now extinct, the Tanna ground dove, also known as Forster's dove of Tanna

These conflicts continued after the journey with the problem of who should write the official account of the travels. Lord Sandwich, although willing to pay the promised money, was irritated with Johann Reinhold Forster's opening chapter and tried to have it edited. However, Forster did not want to have his writing corrected "like a theme of a School-boy", and stubbornly refused any compromise. As a result, the official account was written by Cook, and the Forsters were deprived of the right to compile the account and did not obtain payment for their work. During the negotiations, the younger Forster decided to release an unofficial account of their travels. In 1777, his book A Voyage Round the World in His Britannic Majesty's Sloop Resolution, Commanded by Capt. James Cook, during the Years, 1772, 3, 4, and 5 was published. This report was the first account of Cook's second voyage (it appeared six weeks before the official publication) and was intended for the general public. The English version and his own translation into German (published 1778–80) earned the young author real fame. The poet Christoph Martin Wieland praised the book as the most important one of his time, and even today it remains one of the most important journey descriptions ever written. The book also had a significant impact on German literature, culture and science, influencing such scientists as Alexander von Humboldt and it inspired many ethnologists of later times.

Forster wrote well-polished German prose, which was not only scientifically accurate and objective, but also exciting and easy to read. This differed from conventional travel literature of the time, insofar as it presented more than a mere collection of data – it also demonstrated coherent, colourful and reliable ethnographical facts that resulted from detailed and sympathetic observation. He often interrupted the description to enrich it with philosophical remarks about his observations. His main focus was always on the people he encountered: their behavior, customs, habits, religions and forms of social organization. In A Voyage Round the World he even presented the songs sung by the people of Polynesia, complete with lyrics and notation. The book is one of the most important sources concerning the societies of the Southern Pacific from the times before European influence had become significant.

Both Forsters also published descriptions of their South Pacific travels in the Berlin-based Magazin von merkwürdigen neuen Reisebeschreibungen ("Magazine of strange new travel accounts"), and Georg published a translation of "A Voyage to the South Sea, by Lieutenant William Bligh, London 1792" in 1791–93.

== Forster at universities ==
The publication of A Voyage Round the World brought Forster scientific recognition all over Europe. The respectable Royal Society made him a member on 9 January 1777, though he was not even 23 years old. He was granted similar titles from academies ranging from Berlin to Madrid. These appointments, however, were unpaid.

He travelled to Paris to seek out a discussion with the American revolutionary Benjamin Franklin in 1777. In 1778, he went to Germany to take a teaching position as a Natural History professor at the Collegium Carolinum in Kassel, where he met Therese Heyne, the daughter of classicist Christian Gottlob Heyne. They married in 1785 (which was after he left Kassel) and had two surviving children, Therese Forster and Clara Forster, but an unhappy marriage. She would eventually leave him for Ludwig Ferdinand Huber and became one of the first independent female writers in Germany. From his time in Kassel on, Forster actively corresponded with important figures of the Enlightenment, including Lessing, Herder, Wieland and Goethe. He also initiated cooperation between the Carolinum in Kassel and the University of Göttingen where his friend Georg Christoph Lichtenberg worked. Together, they founded and published the scientific and literary journal Göttingisches Magazin der Wissenschaften und Litteratur. Forster's closest friend, Samuel Thomas von Sömmering, arrived in Kassel shortly after Forster, and both were soon involved with the Rosicrucians in Kassel, where Forster took the secret name Amadeus Sragorisinus Segenitor.

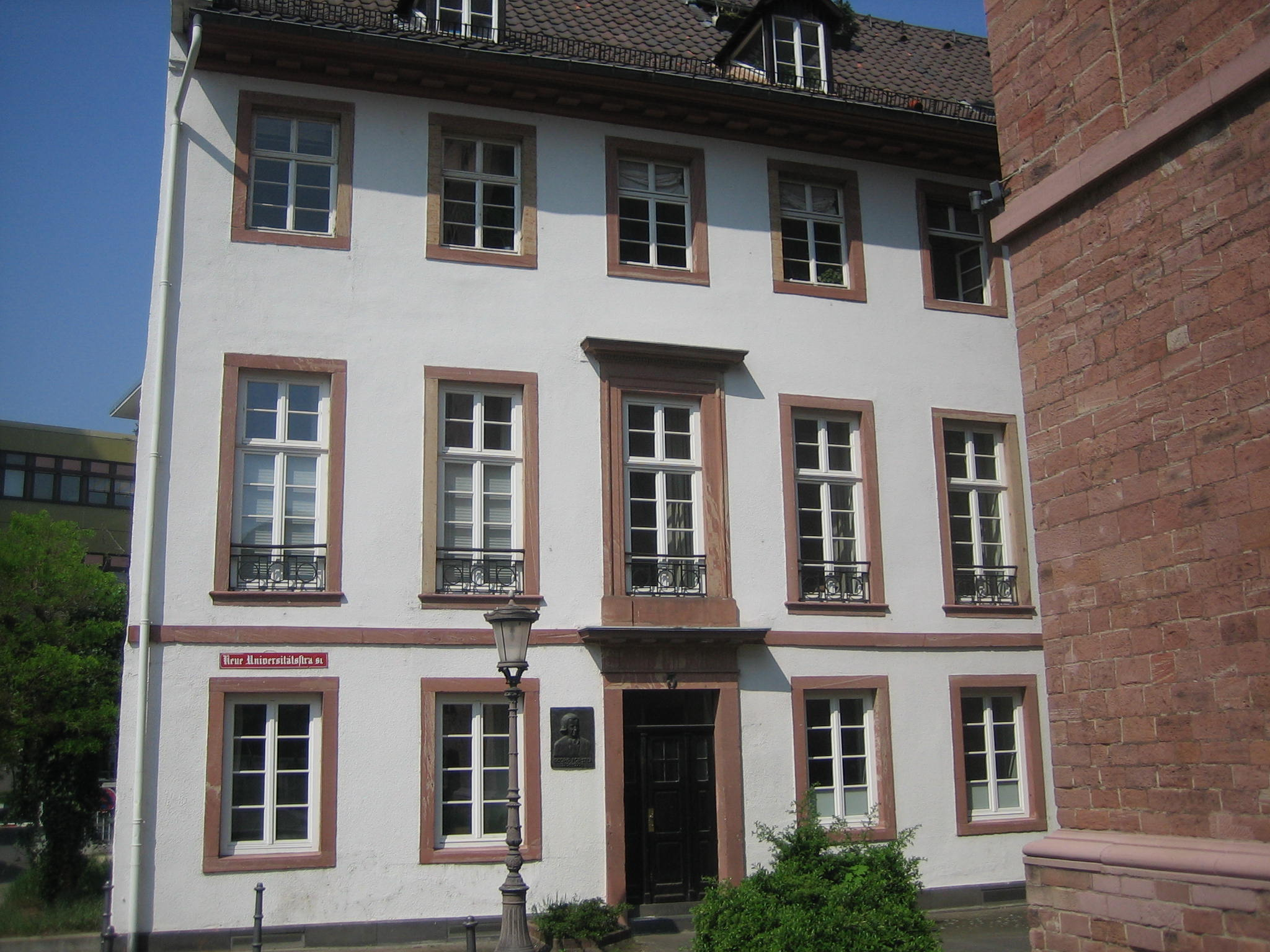
The house in which Georg Forster lived during his time in Mainz, with a commemorative plaque next to the door

However, by 1783 Forster saw that his involvement with the Rosicrucians not only led him away from real science, but also deeper into debt (it is said he was not good at money); for these reasons Forster was happy to accept a proposal by the Polish–Lithuanian Commonwealth Commission of National Education and became Chair of Natural History at Vilnius University in 1784. Initially, he was accepted well in Vilnius, but he felt more and more isolated with time. Most of his contacts were still with scientists in Germany; especially notable is his dispute with Immanuel Kant about the definition of race. In 1785, Forster traveled to Halle where he submitted his thesis on the plants of the South Pacific for a doctorate in medicine. Back in Vilnius, Forster's ambitions to build a real natural history scientific centre could not get appropriate financial support from the authorities in Polish–Lithuanian Commonwealth. Moreover, his famous speech on natural history in 1785 went almost unnoticed and was not printed until 1843. These events led to high tensions between him and the local community. Eventually, he broke the contract six years short of its completion as Catherine II of Russia had offered him a place on a journey around the world (the Mulovsky expedition) for a high honorarium and a position as a professor in Saint Petersburg. This resulted in a conflict between Forster and the influential Polish scientist Jędrzej Śniadecki. However, the Russian proposal was withdrawn and Forster left Vilnius. He then settled in Mainz, where he became head librarian of the University of Mainz, a position held previously by his friend Johannes von Müller, who made sure Forster would succeed him when Müller moved to the administration of Elector Friedrich Karl Josef von Erthal.

Forster regularly published essays on contemporary explorations and continued to be a very prolific translator; for instance, he wrote about Cook's third journey to the South Pacific, and about the Bounty expedition, as well as translating Cook's and Bligh's diaries from these journeys into German. From his London years, Forster was in contact with Sir Joseph Banks, the initiator of the Bounty expedition and a participant in Cook's first journey. While at the University of Vilnius he wrote the article "Neuholland und die brittische Colonie in Botany-Bay", published in the Allgemeines historisches Taschenbuch (Berlin, December 1786), an essay on the future prospects of the English colony founded in New South Wales in 1788.

Another interest of his was indology – one of the main goals of his failed expedition to be financed by Catherine II had been to reach India. He translated the Sanskrit play Shakuntala using a Latin version provided by Sir William Jones; this strongly influenced Johann Gottfried Herder, and triggered German interest in the culture of India.

== Views from the Lower Rhine ==
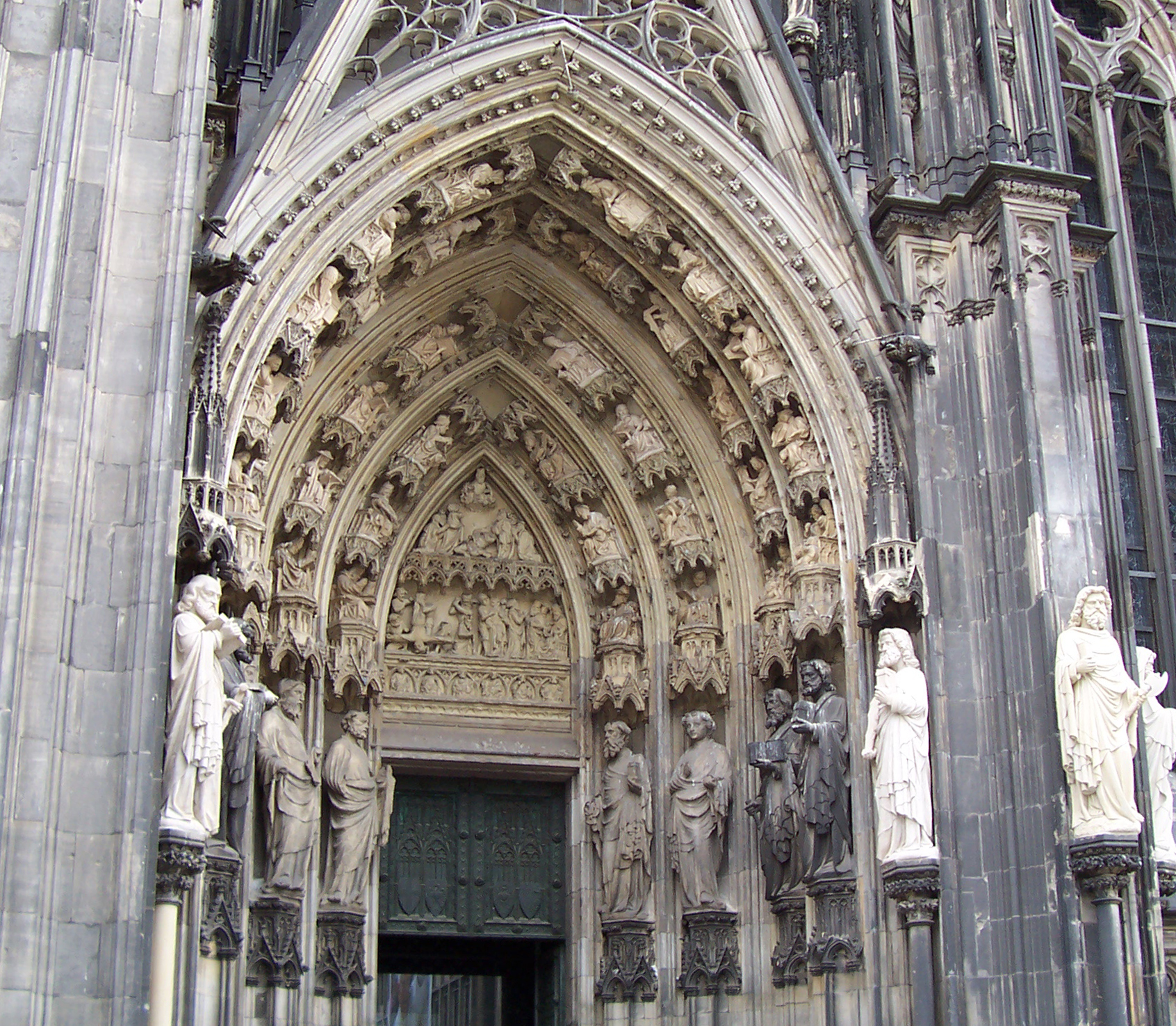
One of the entrances of Cologne Cathedral, which was praised in Ansichten vom Niederrhein

In the second quarter of 1790, Forster and the young Alexander von Humboldt started from Mainz on a long journey through the Southern Netherlands, the United Provinces, and England, eventually finishing in Paris. The impressions from the journey were described in a three volume publication Ansichten vom Niederrhein, von Brabant, Flandern, Holland, England und Frankreich im April, Mai und Juni 1790 (Views of the Lower Rhine, from Brabant, Flanders, Holland, England, and France in April, May and June 1790), published 1791–94. Goethe said about the book: "One wants, after one has finished reading, to start it over, and wishes to travel with such a good and knowledgeable observer." The book includes comments on the history of art that were as influential for the discipline as A Voyage Round the world was for ethnology. Forster was, for example, one of the first writers who gave just treatment to the Gothic architecture of Cologne Cathedral, which was widely perceived as "barbarian" at that time. The book conformed well to the early Romantic intellectual movements in German-speaking Europe.

Forster's main interest, however, was again focused on the social behavior of people, as 15 years earlier in the Pacific. The national uprisings in Flanders and Brabant and the revolution in France sparked his curiosity. The journey through these regions, together with the Netherlands and England, where citizens' freedoms were equally well developed, in the end helped him to resolve his own political opinions. From that time on he was to be a confident opponent of the ancien régime. With other German scholars, he welcomed the outbreak of the revolution as a clear consequence of the Enlightenment. As early as 30 July 1789, shortly after he heard about the Storming of the Bastille, he wrote to his father-in-law, philologist Christian Gottlob Heyne, that it was beautiful to see what philosophy had nurtured in people's minds and then had realized in the state. To educate people about their rights in this way, he wrote, was after all the surest way; the rest would then result as if by itself.

== Life as a revolutionary ==
=== Foundation of the Mainz Republic ===
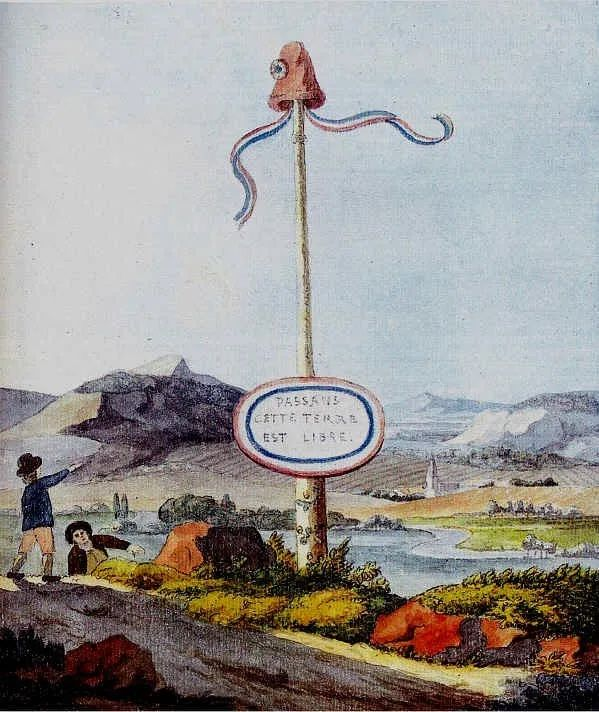
A liberty pole, a symbol of revolutionary France as used in the Republic of Mainz. Watercolor by Johann Wolfgang von Goethe

The French revolutionary army under General Custine gained control over Mainz on 21 October 1792. Two days later, Forster joined others in establishing a Jacobin Club called "Freunde der Freiheit und Gleichheit" ("Friends of Freedom and Equality") in the Electoral Palace. From early 1793 he was actively involved in organizing the Mainz Republic. This first republic located on German soil was constituted on the principles of democracy, and encompassed areas on the left bank of the Rhine between Landau and Bingen. Forster became vice-president of the republic's temporary administration and a candidate in the elections to the local parliament, the Rheinisch-Deutscher Nationalkonvent (Rhenish-German National Convention). From January to March 1793, he was an editor of Die neue Mainzer Zeitung oder Der Volksfreund (The new Mainz newspaper or The People's Friend), a name chosen in reference to Marat's L'Ami du peuple. In his first article he wrote:

Die Pressefreiheit herrscht endlich innerhalb dieser Mauern, wo die Buchdruckerpresse erfunden ward.
The freedom of the press finally reigns within these walls where the printing press was invented.

This freedom did not last long, though. The Mainz Republic existed only until the retreat of the French troops in July 1793 after the siege of Mainz.

Forster was not present in Mainz during the siege. As representatives of the Mainz National Convention, he and Adam Lux had been sent to Paris to apply for Mainz – which was unable to exist as an independent state – to become a part of the French Republic. The application was accepted, but had no effect, since Mainz was conquered by Prussian and Austrian troops, and the old order was restored. Forster lost his library and collections and decided to remain in Paris.

=== Death in revolutionary Paris ===
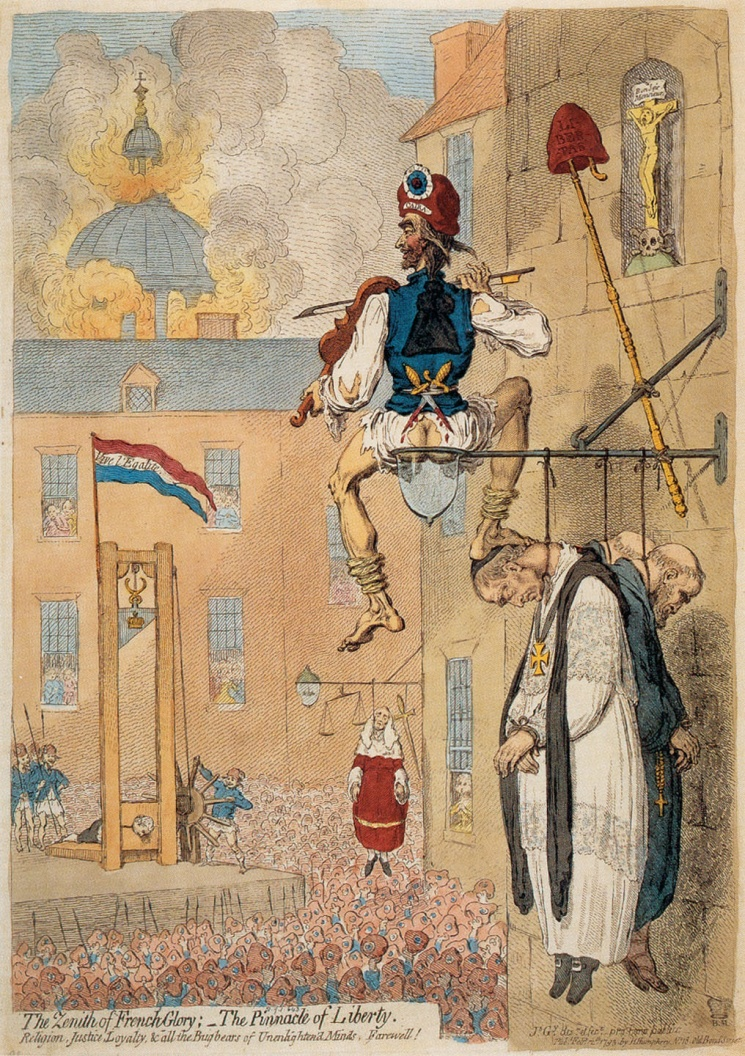
"The Pinnacle of Liberty", a satire by James Gillray

Based on a decree by Emperor Francis II inflicting punishments on German subjects who collaborated with the French revolutionary government, Forster was declared an outlaw and placed under the Imperial ban; a prize of 100 ducats was set on his head and he could not return to Germany. Devoid of all means of making a living and without his wife, who had stayed in Mainz with their children and her later husband Ludwig Ferdinand Huber, he remained in Paris. At this point the revolution in Paris had entered the Reign of Terror introduced by the Committee of Public Safety under the rule of Maximilien Robespierre. Forster had the opportunity to experience the difference between the promises of the revolution of happiness for all and its cruel practice. In contrast to many other German supporters of the revolution, like for instance Friedrich Schiller, Forster did not turn back from his revolutionary ideals under the pressure of the terror. He viewed the events in France as a force of nature that could not be slowed and that had to release its own energies to avoid being even more destructive.

Before the reign of terror reached its climax, Forster died after a rheumatic illness in his small attic apartment at Rue des Moulins in Paris on 10 January 1794, at the age of thirty-nine. At the time, he was making plans to visit India.

== Views on nations and their culture ==
Forster had partial Scottish roots and was born in Polish Royal Prussia, and therefore was by birth a Polish subject. He worked in Russia, England, Poland and in several German countries of his time. Finally, he finished his life in France. He worked in different milieus and traveled a lot from his youth on. It was his view that this, together with his scientific upbringing based on the principles of the Enlightenment, gave him a wide perspective on different ethnic and national communities:

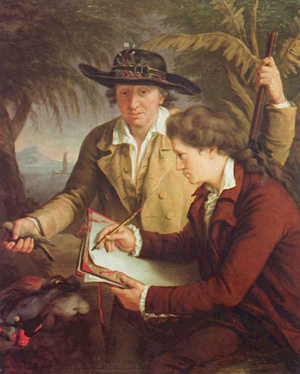
Johann Reinhold Forster and Georg Forster, by John Francis Rigaud, London 1780. The plant in the brim of the hat is a Forstera sedifolia and the bird in Johann Forster's hand a New Zealand bellbird, locating the scene in New Zealand. However, the painting has been commonly called "Reinhold and George Forster at Tahiti" or similar.

All peoples of the earth have equal claims to my good will ... and my praise and blame are independent of national prejudice.

In his opinion all human beings have the same abilities with regard to reason, feelings and imagination, but these basic ingredients are used in different ways and in different environments, which gives rise to different cultures and civilizations. According to him it is obvious that the culture on Tierra del Fuego is at a lower level of development than European culture, but he also admits that the conditions of life there are much more difficult and this gives people very little chance to develop a higher culture. Based on these opinions he was classified as one of the main examples of 18th-century German cosmopolitanism.

In contrast to the attitude expressed in these writings and to his Enlightenment background, he used insulting terms expressing prejudice against Poles in his private letters during his stay in Vilnius and in a diary from the journey through Poland, but he never published any manifestation of this attitude. These insults only became known after his death, when his private correspondence and diaries were released to the public. Since Forster's published descriptions of other nations were seen as impartial scientific observations, Forster's disparaging description of Poland in his letters and diaries was often taken at face value in Imperial and Nazi Germany, where it was used as a means of science-based support for a purported German superiority. The spreading of the "Polnische Wirtschaft" (Polish economy) stereotype is most likely due to the influence of his letters.

Forster's attitude brought him into conflict with the people of the different nations he encountered and made him welcome nowhere, as he was too revolutionary and antinational for Germans, proud and opposing in his dealings with Englishmen, too unconcerned about Polish science for Poles, and too insignificant politically and ignored while in France.

== Legacy ==
After Forster's death, his works were mostly forgotten, except in professional circles. This was partly due to his involvement in the French revolution. However, his reception changed with the politics of the times, with different periods focusing on different parts of his work. In the period of rising nationalism after the Napoleonic era he was regarded in Germany as a "traitor to his country", overshadowing his work as an author and scientist. This attitude rose even though the philosopher Karl Wilhelm Friedrich Schlegel wrote about Forster at the beginning of the 19th century:

Among all those authors of prose who are justified in laying claim to a place in the ranks of German classics, none breathes the spirit of free progress more than Georg Forster.

Some interest in Forster's life and revolutionary actions was revived in the context of the liberal sentiments leading up to the 1848 revolution. But he was largely forgotten in the Germany of Wilhelm II and more so in Nazi Germany, where interest in Forster was limited to his stance on Poland from his private letters. Interest in Forster resumed in the 1960s in East Germany, where he was interpreted as a champion of class struggle. The GDR research station in Antarctica that was opened on 25 October 1987, was named after him. In West Germany, the search for democratic traditions in German history also led to a more diversified picture of him in the 1970s. The Alexander von Humboldt foundation named a scholarship program for foreign scholars from developing countries after him. His reputation as one of the first and most outstanding German ethnologists is indisputable, and his works are seen as crucial in the development of ethnology in Germany into a separate branch of science.

The ethnographical items collected by Georg and Johann Reinhold Forster are now presented as the Cook-Forster-Sammlung (Cook–Forster Collection) in the Sammlung für Völkerkunde anthropological collection in Göttingen. Another collection of items collected by the Forsters is on display at the Pitt Rivers Museum in Oxford.

Recent scholarship has reassessed Forster's significance as a traveler, ethnographer and revolutionary, situating his work within broader debates on Enlightenment, colonialism and race. Andrea Wulf has drawn on Forster's publications and extensive correspondence to present his life as a journey through the intellectual and political upheavals of the late eighteenth century. Other recent studies have focused on his Pacific travel writing and its role in shaping Enlightenment ideas about Oceania and cultural difference.

== Works ==
- A Voyage Round the World in His Britannic Majesty's Sloop Resolution, Commanded by Capt. James Cook, during the Years, 1772, 3, 4, and 5 (1777) Internet Archive scans: Vol. I and II; modern publication with commentary: (preview)
- Characteres generum plantarum, quas in Itinere ad Insulas Maris Australis, Collegerunt, Descripserunt, Delinearunt, annis MDCCLXXII-MDCCLXXV Joannes Reinoldus Forster et Georgius Forster (1775/76), archive.org
- De Plantis Esculentis Insularum Oceani Australis Commentatio Botanica (1786) available online at Project Gutenberg
- Florulae Insularum Australium Prodromus (1786) available online at Project Gutenberg and Biodiversity Heritage Library (DOI:10.5962/bhl.title.10725)
- Essays on moral and natural geography, natural history and philosophy (1789–97)
- Views of the Lower Rhine, Brabant, Flanders (three volumes, 1791–94)
- Georg Forsters Werke, Sämtliche Schriften, Tagebücher, Briefe, Deutsche Akademie der Wissenschaften zu Berlin, G. Steiner et al. Berlin: Akademie 1958
- Werke in vier Bänden, Gerhard Steiner (editor). Leipzig: Insel 1965. ASIN: B00307GDQ0
- Reise um die Welt, Gerhard Steiner (editor). Frankfurt am Main: Insel, 1983. ISBN 3-458-32457-7
- Ansichten vom Niederrhein, Gerhard Steiner (editor). Frankfurt am Main: Insel, 1989. ISBN 3-458-32836-X
- Georg Forster, Briefe an Ernst Friedrich Hector Falcke. Neu aufgefundene Forsteriana aus der Gold- und Rosenkreuzerzeit, Michael Ewert, Hermann Schüttler (editors). Georg-Forster-Studien Beiheft 4. Kassel: Kassel University Press 2009. ISBN 978-3-89958-485-1

== See also ==
- Category:Taxa named by Georg Forster
- European and American voyages of scientific exploration
- List of important publications in anthropology
