= Hochzeit =

Hochzeit (German for "wedding") may refer to:

- Hochzeit, village in Germany prior to 1945, now Stare Osieczno in Poland
- Hochzeit, German name of Wiślina, a village in Poland
- Die Hochzeit uncompleted opera by Wagner
- Hochzeit (Subway to Sally album)
