= Daniel Ernst Jablonski =

German theologian

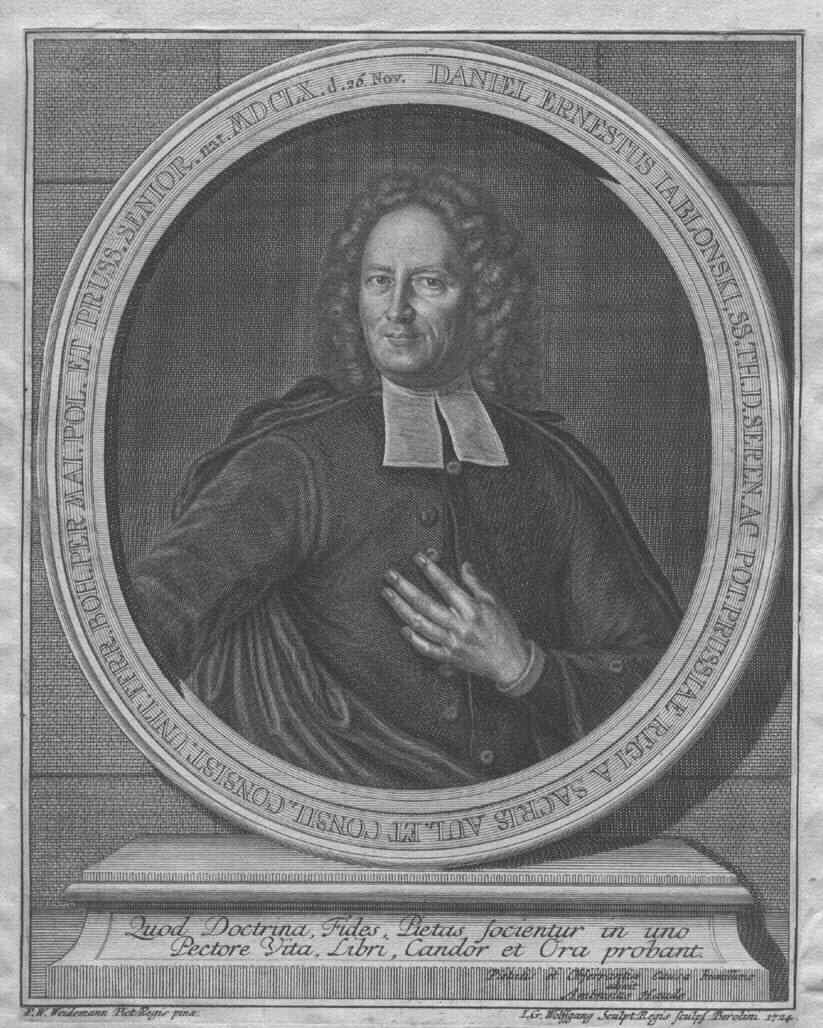
Daniel Ernestus Jablonski. A drawing by Friedrich Wilhelm Weidemann, 1724

Daniel Ernst Jablonski (20 November 1660, Mokry Dwór (Nassenhuben), Royal Prussia, Crown of Poland – 25 May 1741, Berlin) was a German theologian and reformer of Czech origin, known for his efforts to bring about a union between Lutheran and Calvinist Protestants.

== Life ==
Jablonski was born in the village of Nassenhuben, near Danzig (Gdańsk). His father, Peter Figulus, was a minister of Unity of the Brethren (Latin: Unitas fratrum; Czech: Jednota bratrská - also known as "Bohemian Brethren"); the son preferred the Bohemian surname Jablonski (Jablonský) which was based on his father's birthplace - Jablonné nad Orlicí. He was the younger brother of Johann Theodor Jablonski. His maternal grandfather, Johann Amos Comenius (d. 1670), was the last bishop of the Unity. Having studied at Frankfurt (Oder) and at Oxford, Jablonski entered upon his career as a preacher at Magdeburg in 1683. From 1686 to 1691 he was the head of the Brethren college at Polish Leszno (German: Lissa), a position which had been filled by his grandfather. Consecrated a bishop of the Unity for the churches in Poland, he was encouraged by the Elector Friedrich Wilhelm I of Brandenburg, King in Prussia, to secure the Apostolic Succession to the Renewed Unity of Brethren, the Moravian Church, and consecrated David Nitschmann bishop in Berlin in 1735.

Still retaining his connection with the Bohemians, he was appointed court preacher at Königsberg in 1691 by the elector of Brandenburg, Frederick III, and here, entering upon a career of great activity, he soon became a person of influence in court circles. In 1693 he was transferred to Berlin as court preacher, and in 1699 he was consecrated a bishop of the Unity of the Brethren.

At Berlin Jablonski worked hard to bring about a union between the followers of Luther and those of Calvin; the courts of Berlin, Hanover, Brunswick and Gotha were interested in his scheme, and his principal helper was the philosopher Gottfried Leibniz. His idea appears to have been to form a general union between the German, the English and the Swiss Protestants, and thus to establish una eademque sancta catholica et apostolica eademque evangelica et reformata ecclesia ("the one and selfsame holy, catholic, and apostholic and selfsame evangelical and reformed Church"). For some years negotiations were carried on with a view to attaining this end, but eventually it was found impossible to surmount the many difficulties in the way; Jablonski and Leibniz, however, did not cease to believe in the possibility of accomplishing their purpose. Jablonski's next plan was to reform the Church of Prussia by introducing into it the episcopate, and also the liturgy of the Church of England, but here again he was unsuccessful.

== Academic achievements ==
As a scholar, Jablonski brought out a Hebrew edition of the Old Testament, and translated Bentley's A Confutation of Atheism into Latin (1696). He had some share in founding the Brandenburgische Societät der Wissenschaften. Between 1700 and 1731 he became secretary of the Academy and vice president in 1710, 1715, 1719, 1723, 1727, 1729, 1731 and 1733. Between 1710 and 1731 Jablonski was director of the Philology and Oriental Studies at the Academy. Between 1733 and 1741 he was president of the Academy. He received a degree from the University of Oxford.
