= Botanical Garden of the University of Halle-Wittenberg =

University botanic garden in Germany from 1698

Coordinates: 51.4889°N 11.9604°E

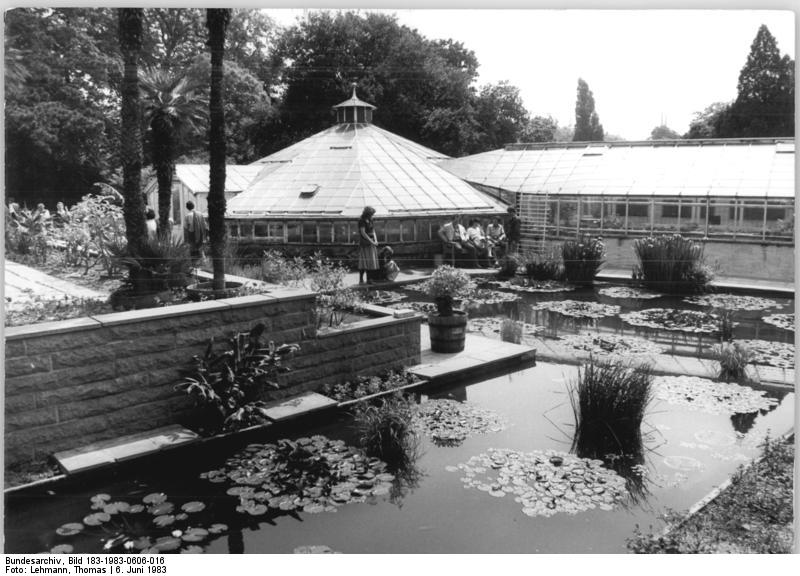
Botanischer Garten Halle, 1983

The Botanische Garten der Martin-Luther-Universität Halle-Wittenberg (4.5 hectares) is an arboretum and botanical garden maintained by the University of Halle-Wittenberg. It is located at Am Kirchtor 3 in the city of Halle, Saxony-Anhalt, Germany, and open daily in the warmer months. An admission fee is charged.

The garden's origins can be traced back to 1698 when Frederick III, Prince Elector of Brandenburg donated parts of his hortus medicus to the university in Halle. By 1749 the garden contained 191 plants species. In 1787 it was enlarged to its present size by Karl Christoph von Hoffmann (1735-1801), university chancellor, in response to activities of garden directors Johann Reinhold Forster (1729-1798), who participated in Captain James Cook's second world expedition, and Philipp Kaspar Junghans (1736-1798). Towards the end of the 18th century many greenhouses were constructed, and by 1825 the garden contained some 7,000 species. Its tropical greenhouse was built in 1872 with the Victoria greenhouse following in 1902. During the 20th century, additional modern green houses were built and old ones renovated, including the 1994 reconstruction of the Victoria greenhouse. The garden grounds also contain the former university observatory, designed by Carl Gotthard Langhans (1732-1808).

Today the garden contains about 12,000 species, including systematic collections of orchids, bromeliads, carnivorous plants, grass species (especially from the tribe Aveneae), Mammillaria (Cactaceae), Echinodorus (Alismataceae), and Cryptocoryne (Araceae). It also contains an important collection of Central Asian plants, especially from Mongolia, which is believed to be one of the largest such collections outside Russia and Mongolia, and preserves some rare and extinct plants with emphasis on the local region of Saxony-Anhalt, including Artemisia rupestris, as well as exotics such as Carlina diae (Asteraceae) from Crete and Sophora toromiro from the Easter Islands.

The garden is organized into the following major areas:

- Alpine garden with many high mountain plants surrounds a small plant bed with beach and sand dune plants
- American plants
- Asian plants, particularly Berberis and Cotoneaster
- Arboretum, systematically arranged, with very old specimens of Acer campestre, Gymnocladus dioicus, Juglans nigra, Metasequoia glyptostroboides, and Sophora japonica
- Steppe plants from the East Mediterranean region and Central Asia
- Systematic garden, organized according to the "System der natürlichen Pflanzenfamilien" of A. Engler

The garden also contains a number of greenhouses (3,000 m^{2} total area) including:

- Arid greenhouse - cacti and succulents from the Americas and Africa, with a smaller section dedicated to Madagascar
- Evergreen plant greenhouse
- Orangery
- Tropical greenhouse - lianas, epiphytes and useful plants including banana, coffee, pepper, and vanilla
- Victoria greenhouse - tropical aquatic plants including mangroves and collections of Echinodorus and Cryptocoryne

== Garden dreams ==
Halle Botanical Garden is part of the Saxony-Anhalt Garden Dreams project.

== See also ==
- List of botanical gardens in Germany
