= Mokry Dwór, Pomeranian Voivodeship =

Mokry Dwór
- Village
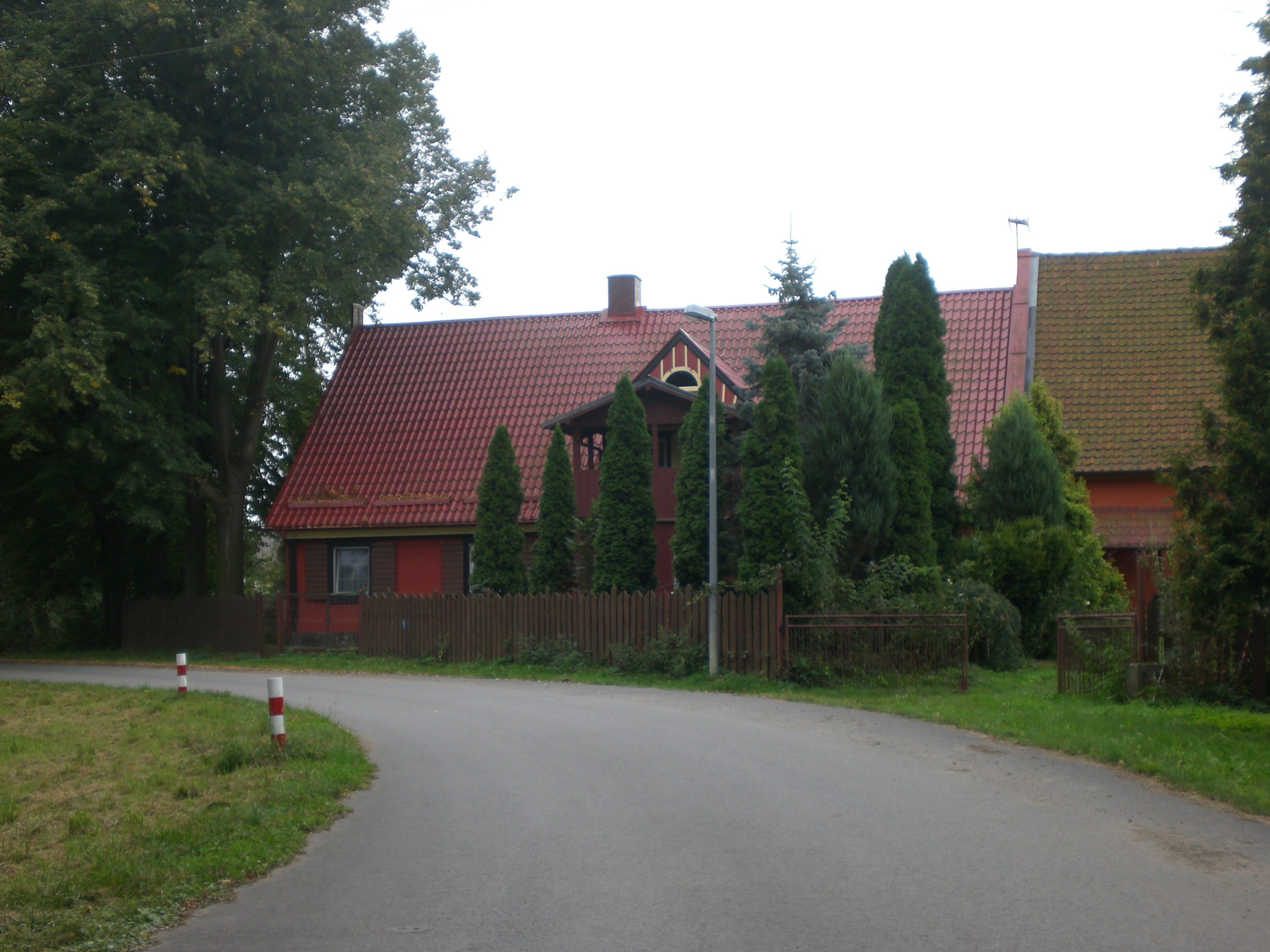

- Location within Poland
- Coordinates: 54°17′34″N 18°42′56″E
- Country: Poland
- Voivodeship: Pomeranian
- County: Gdańsk
- Gmina: Pruszcz Gdański

Population
  - Total: 218
- Time zone: UTC+1 (CET)
  - Summer (DST): UTC+2 (CEST)
- Vehicle registration: GDA

Mokry Dwór ([ˈmɔkrɨ ˈdvur]; German: Nassenhuben) is a village in the administrative district of Gmina Pruszcz Gdański, within Gdańsk County, Pomeranian Voivodeship, in northern Poland.

The village has a population of 218.

== History ==
Mokry Dwór was a private village, administratively located in the Gdańsk County in the Pomeranian Voivodeship of the Kingdom of Poland. A church was first established in 1632. The pastors had their parish house in the adjacent village of Wiślina.

== People born in Mokry Dwór ==
- Georg Forster (1754–1794), geographer, naturalist, ethnologist, travel writer, journalist and revolutionary
- Daniel Ernst Jablonski (1660-1741), theologian
