= King Alfred Chair of English Literature =

Chair of English Literature at the University of Liverpool, England

The King Alfred Chair of English Literature was founded at the University of Liverpool, England in 1881. It was one of the original endowments of the University, funded by William Rathbone and his brothers Samuel and Phillip Rathbone. The early history of the chair was as follows: King Alfred Chair of Modern History and Literature, 1881–82; Modern Literature and History, 1882-1884; Modern Literature and English Language, 1884-1900.

== King Alfred Professors of English Literature ==
The holders of the chair have been:

- 1881–1889: A.C. Bradley
- 1890–1900: Sir Walter Raleigh
- 1901–1925: Oliver Elton
- 1929–1951: Leonard Martin
- 1951–1974: Kenneth Muir FBA
- 1974–1990: Philip Edwards FBA
- 1991–2003: Sir Jonathan Bate CBE FBA
- 2004–2010: Neil Corcoran
- 2020–present: Gregory Lynall
