= Royal Madrilenian Academy of Medicine =

The Royal Madrilenian Academy of Medicine, formally established in 1734, was an academic society dedicated to the study of natural history, natural philosophy, and medicine based in Madrid under the auspices of King Philip V of Spain.

== History ==
The Royal Madrilenian Academy of Medicine began in 1733 under the name of the Madrilenian Society of Medical Literature as a group that met at the house of physician José Arcadio de Ortega to discuss medicine and medical education. However, on August 12, 1734, the society changed its name to the Madrilenian Academy of Medicine and was soon after granted approval by Philip V. Under the king's auspices, the society expanded to encompass scientific discovery of a variety of disciplines, as opposed to solely medicine. However, in 1824, the academy was forced to close by the Spanish government due to a lack of interest in scientific advancement following events such as the Napoleonic Wars.

== Publications ==
From 1734 until 1747, the academy published a journal known as Ephemerides Barometrico-Medicas Matritenses, which contained criticism of medical and scientific literature. The journal also involved the cataloguing of weather and atmospheric conditions in an attempt to explain the effects of such weather on individuals' health. Ephemerides Barometrico-Medicas Matritenses has been described as pseudoscientific by modern scholars.

== Notable members ==
=== José Arcadio de Ortega ===
José Arcadio de Ortega, otherwise known as José Arcadio de Hortega, was a preeminent pharmacist of Eighteenth-century Spain. Ortega owned the house at 9 Montera Street where the Madrilenian Society of Medical Literature was formed and initially met. Following the society's expansion into the academy and endorsement by Philip V, Ortega served as the academy's secretary. In addition to this post, Ortega's responsibilities within the academy involved the teaching of Botany and the cataloguing of medical history. Outside of the academy, Ortega served as the chief of Spain's military pharmacists from 1738 onward and helped to found the Royal Botanical Garden of Madrid.

=== José Cervi ===
José Cervi was an Italian physician and professor of medicine at the University of Parma. Cervi served as the president of the Royal Academy following its sponsorship by Philip V. Prior to his appointment as president, Cervi had previously worked for the royal family as the King's primary physician. Cervi additionally filled the role of president of other scientific societies across Spain, such as the Royal Society of Seville. Due to his preeminent status in medicine, Cervi was admired by many members of the academy.

== Influence ==
Despite not lasting longer than a century, The Royal Madrilenian Academy of Medicine heavily influenced and prompted the founding of several of Spain's later academies, such as the Royal Academy of Sciences. A successor to the academy, incorporated in the mid-nineteenth century, would go on to become Spain's National Academy of Medicine.
