= Sammlung für Völkerkunde =

Museum in Göttingen, Germany

Coordinates: 51°32′06″N 9°56′27″E

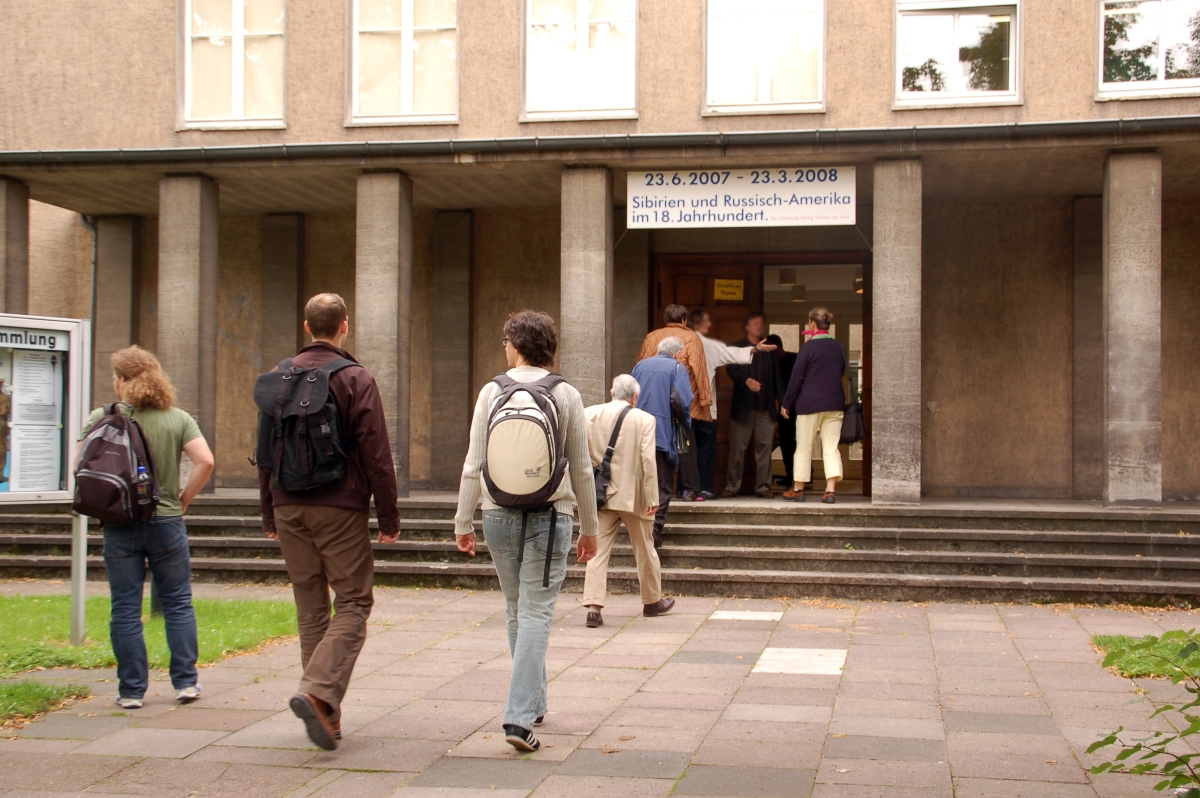
Sammlung für Völkerkunde, Göttingen (2007)

The Sammlung für Völkerkunde (German for Ethnological Collection) at the Institute of Cultural and Social Anthropology of the University of Göttingen is one of Germany's most important ethnological collections. The museum was founded around 1780 and revived around 1930, and is now funded by the state of Lower Saxony.

The collection consists of approximately 17,000 items and focuses on the South Pacific with the Cook-Forster collection, containing items from Hawaii, Tahiti, Tonga, and New Zealand, and on Siberia and the polar regions with the Baron von Asch collection.
