= Philip Edwards (academic) =

20th/21st-century British literary scholar

Philip Walter Edwards, FBA (7 February 1923 – 27 November 2015) was a British literary scholar. He was King Alfred Professor of English Literature at the University of Liverpool from 1974 to 1990. He had previously taught at the University of Birmingham, Harvard University, Trinity College Dublin, and the University of Essex.

== Early life and education ==
Edwards was born on 7 February 1923 in Barrow-in-Furness, Lancashire, England. Having passed the entrance exam, was educated at King Edward's School, an independent school in Birmingham. Aged 16, he passed all but the arithmetic examination of the School Certificate. His father, who has won the Military Cross in the First World War and then worked an agent for the Conservative Party, had expected him to leave school and "become a useful citizen". However, Philip convinced his father to allow him to continue his education, first in sixth form and then, at only 16 and half, at the University of Birmingham. Among his lecturers were A. M. D. Hughes and Helen Gardner.

After completing his undergraduate degree, Edwards served in the Royal Naval Volunteer Reserve for the rest of the Second World War. He was promoted to temporary acting sub-lieutenant to temporary sub-lieutenant with seniority in that rank from 13 February 1944. While serving on HMS Victorious, he was stationed off the Japanese coast while the atomic bombs were dropped.

At the end of the war, he received a Class B release from the Royal Navy as "an Arts student". This was a category for essential workers in the UK's "national reconstruction", but his unusual qualification has been pushed through by the registrar of the University of Birmingham who was a family friend.

== Selected works ==
- Edwards, Philip (1968). Shakespeare and the confines of art. London: Routledge.
- Edwards, Philip (1986). Shakespeare: a writer's progress. Oxford: Oxford University Press. ISBN 978-0192191847.
- Edwards, Philip (2005). Pilgrimage and literary tradition. Cambridge: Cambridge University Press. ISBN 978-0521847629.
