= Henry Gregory =

Henry Gregory may refer to:

- Henry Gregory (instrument maker) (1744–1782), English mathematical and optical instrument maker
- Henry Gregory (politician) (1860–1940), Australian politician
- Sir Henry Holman Gregory (1864–1947), British MP for South Derbyshire, 1918–1922
- Henry Gregory (cricketer) (born 1936), English cricketer

== See also ==
- Harry Gregory (disambiguation)
- Gregory W. Henry, American astronomer
