= Observations Made During a Voyage Round the World =

Johann Reinhold Forster's 1777 account of the second voyage of James Cook

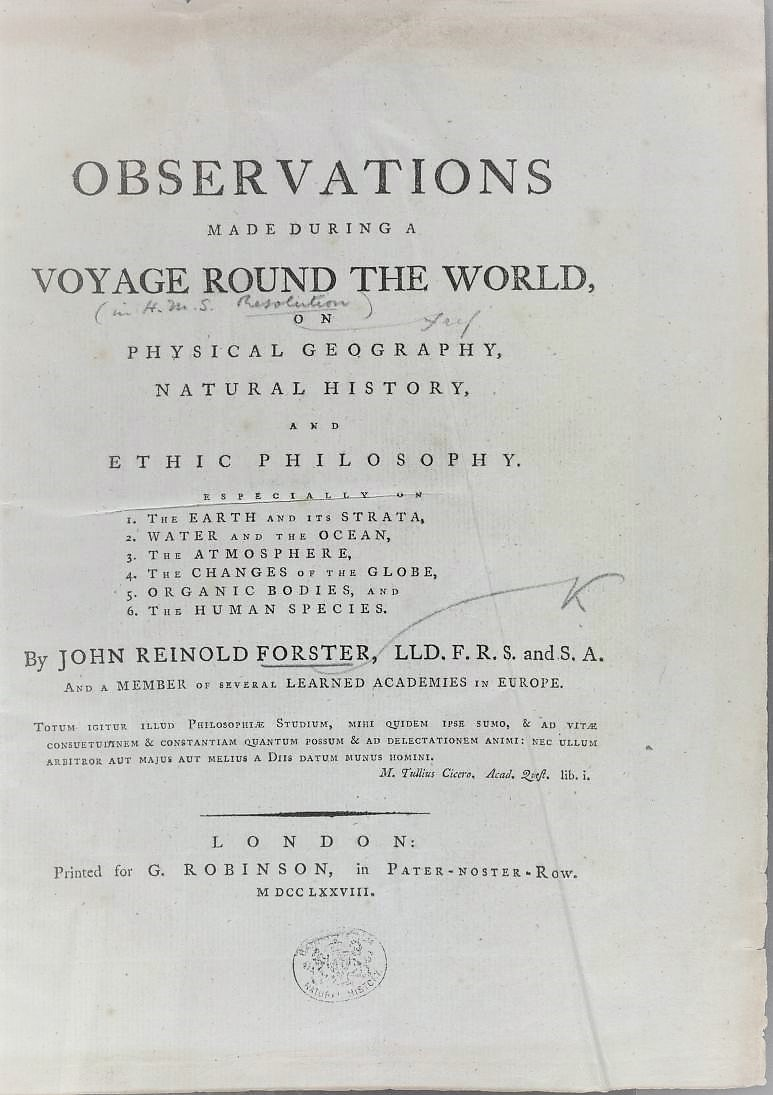
Title page, 1778

Observations Made During a Voyage Round the World is Johann Reinhold Forster's systematic account of the scientific and ethnological results of the second voyage of James Cook. Forster, a former pastor who had become a Fellow of the Royal Society after writing several papers on natural history, and his son Georg had accompanied James Cook as naturalists on board of HMS Resolution. Originally, it had been planned that Forster's account should appear together with Cook's "narrative" of the voyage, but after lengthy arguments between Forster and John Montagu, 4th Earl of Sandwich, the First Lord of the Admiralty, Georg went ahead and published his own narrative instead in 1777, A Voyage Round the World. Observations then appeared in 1778, financed by subscriptions. It was translated into several European languages, including a German translation by Georg Forster.

The book discusses geography, oceanography, ethnology, and anthropology of the natural phenomena, places and people encountered during the voyage. It was praised in contemporary reviews and influenced philosophers like Johann Gottfried Herder. On the other hand, it was dismissed by Forster's opponent William Wales and the later Cook scholar John Beaglehole, and for a long time was not given much recognition. As a book containing results obtained after first hand observation, geographers including David Stoddart more recently considered it among the first works of modern geography.

== Background ==
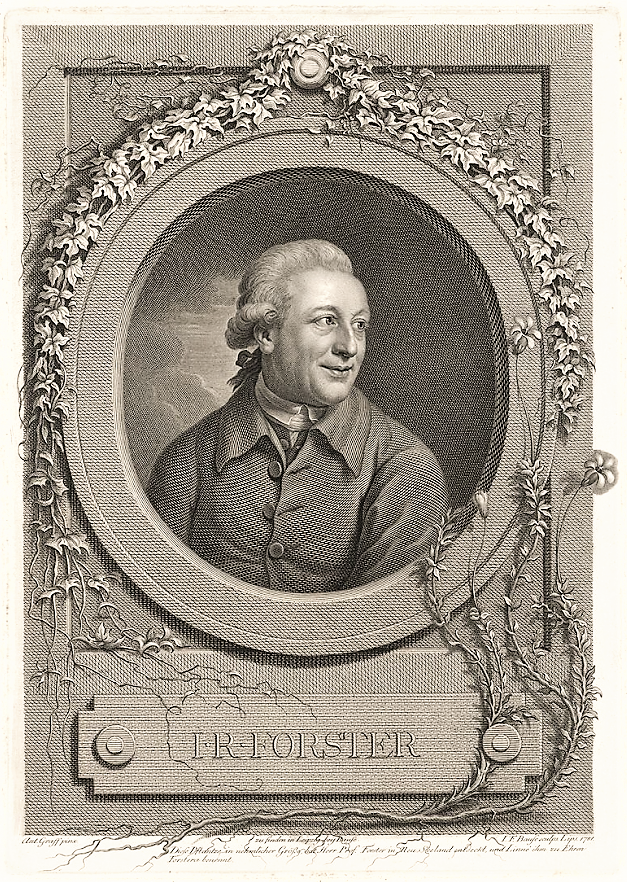
Johann Reinhold Forster, engraving

Johann Reinhold Forster (1729–1798) was a German naturalist. After studying theology at Halle, he became a pastor in the vicinity of Danzig (Gdańsk) in 1753. In 1765, he accepted an offer by the Russian government to inspect the recently founded colonies near Saratov on the Volga River. On the 4,000 km (2,500 mi) journey, he was accompanied by his ten-year old son Georg Forster, who helped his father collect, name and identify hundreds of species of plants. After their return to Saint Petersburg, Forster wrote a report that was critical of the conditions in the colony, and the Forsters left Russia without payment. They then moved to England, where Forster wrote a paper on the natural history of the Volga region, which was presented to the Royal Society, and obtained a teaching position at Warrington Academy in June 1767. He moved to London in 1770, where he wrote papers on natural history as well as reviews and translations, and was elected a Fellow of the Royal Society in February 1772.

Johann and Georg Forster accompanied the explorer James Cook as the naturalists on Cook's second voyage, 1772–1775. On this voyage on board of HMS Resolution, they circumnavigated the world, crossing the Antarctic Circle for the first time in history, and discovered and visited many islands, especially in the South Pacific Ocean. The Forsters and their assistant Anders Sparrman collected many species of plants and described and named both plants and animals. After their return to England, Forster planned to publish his findings, with the first publication the botanical Characteres generum plantarum, which appeared in 1775/76. He also expected, based on pre-voyage promises made by Daines Barrington, the Vice President of the Royal Society, to write the official account of the voyage, which was likely to sell well and bring a large financial reward. Cook, on the other hand, wished to produce his own account. Lord Sandwich, the First Lord of the Admiralty, brokered a compromise that both sides agreed to in April 1776. According to the agreement, Cook would write a first volume containing a narrative of the journey and the nautical observations, while Forster would contribute a second volume on natural history and the ethnology and languages of the peoples encountered. The British Admiralty would pay for engravings that should be distributed between the two books. However, Forster's sample chapters did not satisfy Sandwich, and after further arguments, Cook worked on his own narrative, while Forster's diaries were used by his son Georg to write A Voyage Round the World, which appeared in March 1777, six weeks before Cook's account.

== Writing, publication and translations ==
After the efforts to write a narrative had fallen through, Forster started working on Observations Made During a Voyage Round the World, now as a separate publication. He likely worked on it from late 1776 to May 1778. While the book was no longer tied to Cook's narrative, Forster's writing was in line with the previous agreement. Advertisements calling for subscriptions of the book were circulated in February 1778, likely with copies of Georg Forster's Voyage. The subscribers, who were listed in the book, included the naturalist Joseph Banks, the geographer Alexander Dalrymple and the astronomer Thomas Hornsby. In total, there were about 90 subscribers, with about 30 from the University of Oxford. The preface was completed on 30 May 1778 and the book was printed soon after, with the first copies sent out in July 1778 to recipients including Gustav III, King of Sweden. The printer was G. Robinson. The book was not reprinted in English until 1996.

Between 1778 and 1782, Forster's son Georg translated the book into German, expanding and revising the content, especially of Chapter V, which was partially based on his own writing. In his letters, he complained about the style of the original. This translation appeared in 1783. The book was also translated into French (by Jean Claude Pingeron, 1778), Italian (1785), Russian (1796–1800), Spanish (1832–1833) and Dutch (1788, translated from the German edition); additionally, the ethnographic chapter VI was translated into Swedish (by Carl Christoffer Gjörwell Sr., 1785–1787).

== Content ==
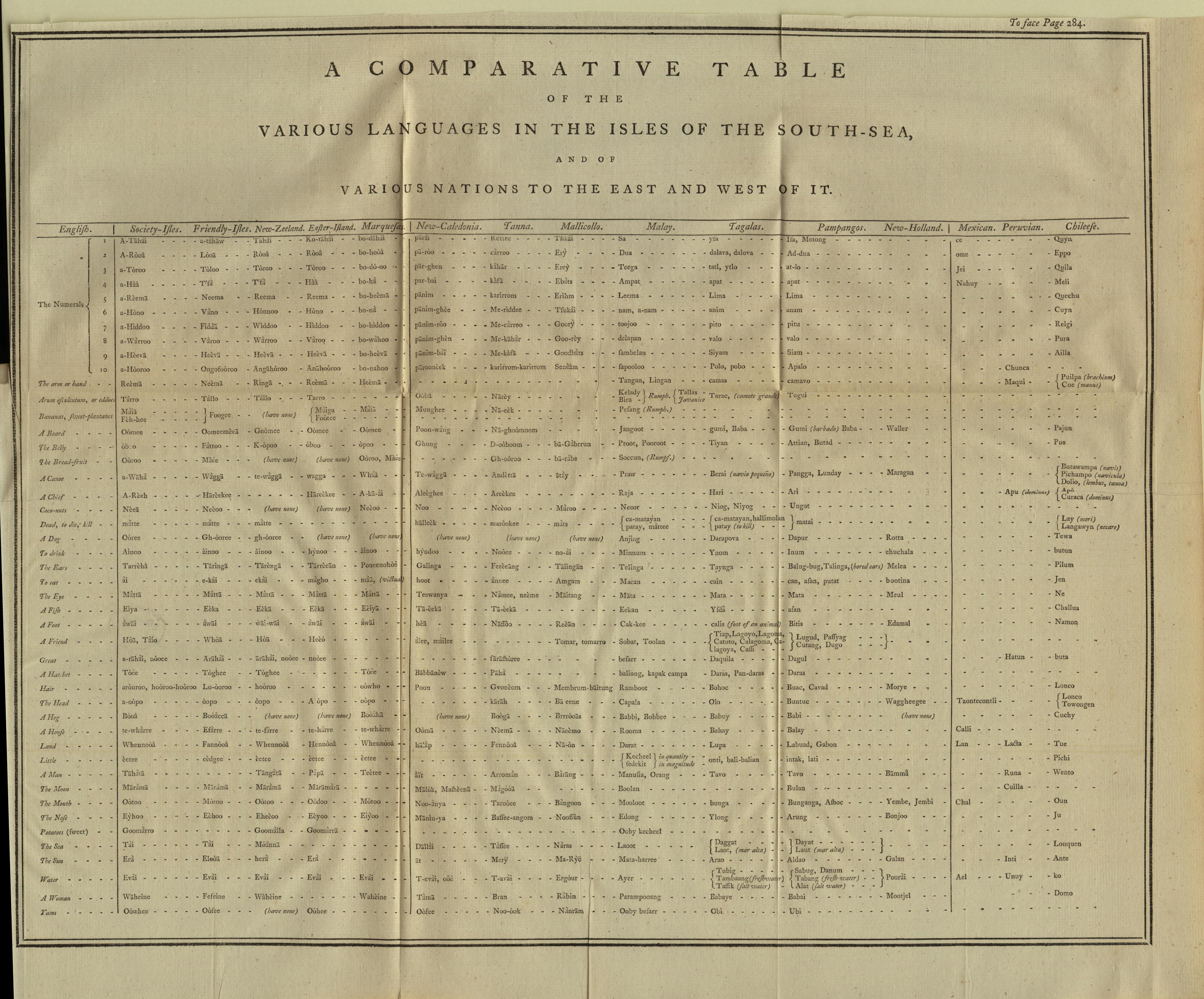
A Comparative Table of the Various Languages in the Isles of the South-Sea

The book starts with a chronological "Journal" collecting the most important days and events in short one-sentence entries. Then a systematic main body follows, organised as follows:

- Chapter I. Remarks on the Earth and Lands, their Inequalities, Strata, and Constituent Parts.
- Chapter II. Remarks on Water and the Ocean.
- Chapter III. Remarks on the Atmosphere and its Changes, Meteors, and Phœnomena.
- Chapter IV. Remarks on the Changes of the Globe.
- Chapter V. Remarks on the Organic Bodies
- Chapter VI. Remarks on the Human Species

An important question discussed in the book is the relationship between volcanoes and the formation of islands. Another is the influence of the temperature on the number of species found in a region, and Forster has been credited as one of the first authors to notice this. In the "remarks on water and the ocean", he discussed the question how icebergs form, dismissing the theory that they were formed only at the estuaries of rivers that was commonly used as "evidence" for the existence of a southern continent.

The "remarks on the human species", considered by Forster to be the most important part of the work, occupy two thirds of the book, and are concerned with the island societies encountered as well the consequences for the study of humanity in general. Forster combined the French philosopher Montesquieu's theory of the influence of the climate on human societies with cultural and historical considerations, and hypothesised that the differences between some societies in similar climate could be explained by being settled in different migrations.

The book contains "A Comparative Table of the Various Languages in the Isles of the South-Sea" and a chart of the region, "chiefly collected from the accounts of Tupaya", but adding information compared to what was known from Cook's first voyage.

== Reception and legacy ==
The book received praise in contemporary reviews, and was recognised by German anthropologist Johann Friedrich Blumenbach and philosopher Immanuel Kant for its influence on modern geography and ethnology. The German philosopher Johann Gottfried Herder was influenced by Forster's anthropology and his approach to the study of the history of man in general. About Forster and his Observations regarding the South Pacific, he wrote in his Outlines of a Philosophy of the History of Man: "The Ulysses of these regions, Reinhold Forster, has given us such a learned and intelligent account of the species and varieties of the human race in them, that we cannot but wish we had similar materials for a philosophico-physical geography of other parts of the world, as foundations for a history of man." Friedrich Ratzel, a pioneer of human geography, held Observations in high regard, and stated about the books's reception, "Unfortunately, Reinhold Forster's philosophical remarks were not given the recognition they merited, and science returned to a point far behind the one to which Forster had guided it."

William Wales, the astronomer on board the Resolution, who quarrelled with Forster and his son publicly, stated he "has not been able to extract anything but Hypothiis" from the book. The Cook scholar John Beaglehole, who was dismissive of Forster to the point of stating "there is nothing that can make him other than one of the Admiralty's vast mistakes", called the book "solid not only with observations but with the characteristics of its author" and stated "it would have been a curious mate for Cook's volumes."

The author of the only scholarly biography of Forster and editor of his journal from the Resolution journey, Michael Hoare, called the book "one of the first modern works to attempt to incorporate the totality of phenomena into a single, if tentative, system"—a characterisation shared by the historian Anne Mariss—and also "the most important systematic contribution to modern geography before Humboldt's Cosmos". The Australian art historian Bernard Smith described Observations as a "remarkable book" and Forster as a "pioneer of social anthropology."

In his review of the 1996 edition, the geographer David Stoddart noted that the book "marked the beginning of modern geography, in that it deployed the comparative sense of firsthand observations across perhaps one-quarter of the earth", distinguishing Forster from his contemporaries who studied geography from home. According to Stoddart, the book contains the first computation of an island's carrying capacity. In 2003, the Massey University anthropologist K. R. Howe described Observations as "long underrated", but now among the "most important European examinations of the new Pacific archive."

== Sources ==
- Beaglehole, John C. (1969) [1961]. The Journals of Captain James Cook on his Voyages of Discovery. Vol. II. Cambridge: Published for the Hakluyt Society at the University Press. OCLC 1052665808.
- Dove, Alfred (1877). "Forster, Reinhold" . Allgemeine Deutsche Biographie (in German). Vol. 7. Leipzig: Duncker & Humblot. pp. 166–172.
- Elliott, Jane (1998). "Observations Made During a Voyage Round the World". Oceania. 68 (3): 216–217. doi:10.1002/j.1834-4461.1998.tb02670.x. JSTOR 40331631. ProQuest 222377154.
- Forster, Johann Reinhold (1996). Thomas, Nicholas; Guest, Harriet; Dettelbach, Michael (eds.). Observations Made during a Voyage round the World. Honolulu: University of Hawaiʻi Press. ISBN 978-0-8248-1725-1. OCLC 473463159.
- Forster, Johann Reinhold; Forster, Johann Georg Adam (1788). Waarneemingen over de aardrijkskunde, de natuurkunde, den aart en de zeden der menschen (in Dutch). Haarlem: A. Loosjes. OCLC 71443960.
- Gordon, Joseph Stuart (1975). Reinhold and Georg Forster in England, 1766–1780 (Thesis). Ann Arbor: Duke University. OCLC 732713365.
- Herder, Johann Gottfried (1800). Outlines of a Philosophy of the History of Man. Translated by Churchill, T. London: J. Johnson. OCLC 1157726653.
- Hoare, Michael Edward (1967). "Johann Reinhold Forster: The Neglected 'Philosopher' of Cook's Second Voyage (1772-1775)". The Journal of Pacific History. 2: 215–224. doi:10.1080/00223346708572117. ISSN 0022-3344. JSTOR 25167919.
- Hoare, Michael Edward (1976). The Tactless Philosopher: Johann Reinhold Forster (1729–98). Hawthorne Press. ISBN 978-0-7256-0121-8.
- Hoare, Michael Edward (1982). The Resolution Journal of Johann Reinhold Forster, 1772–1775. Hakluyt Society. ISBN 978-0-904180-10-7.
- Howe, K. R. (2000). Nature, Culture, and History: The "Knowing" of Oceania. Honolulu: University of Hawaiʻi Press. ISBN 978-0-8248-6372-2.
- Howe, K. R. (2003). The Quest for Origins: Who first Discovered and Settled the Pacific Islands?. Honolulu: University of Hawaiʻi Press. ISBN 978-0-8248-2750-2.
- Mariss, Anne (9 September 2019). Johann Reinhold Forster and the Making of Natural History on Cook's Second Voyage, 1772–1775. Rowman & Littlefield. ISBN 978-1-4985-5615-6.
- Netzley, Patricia D. (1999). Environmental Literature: An Encyclopedia of Works, Authors, and Themes. Santa Barbara, Calif.: ABC-CLIO. ISBN 978-1-57607-000-0.
- Ratzel, Friedrich (1899). Anthropogeographie (in German). Stuttgart: J. Engelhorn.
- Smith, Bernard (1985). European Vision and the South Pacific. New Haven: Yale University Press. ISBN 978-0-300-02815-7.
- Steiner, Gerhard (1977). Georg Forster (in German). Stuttgart: J.B. Metzler. ISBN 978-3-476-10156-3. OCLC 462099778.
- Stoddart, David R. (1996). ""A Learned, Intelligent, and Judicious Traveller"". Geographical Review. 86 (4): 604–610. doi:10.2307/215935. ISSN 0016-7428. JSTOR 215935.
- Thomas, Nicholas (1996). "Johann Reinhold Forster and his Observations". Observations Made during a Voyage round the World. By Forster, Johann Reinhold, Forster, Johann Reinhold. Thomas, Nicholas; Guest, Harriet; Dettelbach, Michael (eds.). Honolulu: University of Hawaiʻi Press. ISBN 978-0-8248-1725-1. OCLC 473463159.
- Thomas, Nicholas; Berghof, Oliver (2000). Introduction. A Voyage Round the World. By Forster, George. Thomas, Nicholas; Berghof, Oliver (eds.). Honolulu: University of Hawaiʻi Press. pp. xix–xliii. ISBN 978-0-8248-6130-8. OCLC 70765538.
- Uhlig, Ludwig (2004). Georg Forster: Lebensabenteuer eines gelehrten Weltbürgers (1754–1794) (in German). Vandenhoeck & Ruprecht. ISBN 9783525367315.
- Williams, Glyn (22 October 2013). Naturalists at Sea: Scientific Travellers from Dampier to Darwin. Yale University Press. ISBN 978-0-300-18073-2.
