= Harry Gregory =

Harry Gregory may refer to:

- Harry Gregory (Australian footballer) (1902–1993), Australian rules footballer
- Harry Gregory (footballer, born 1943) (1943–2016), English football midfielder

== See also ==
- Henry Gregory (disambiguation)
