= Azimuth compass =

Nautical instrument

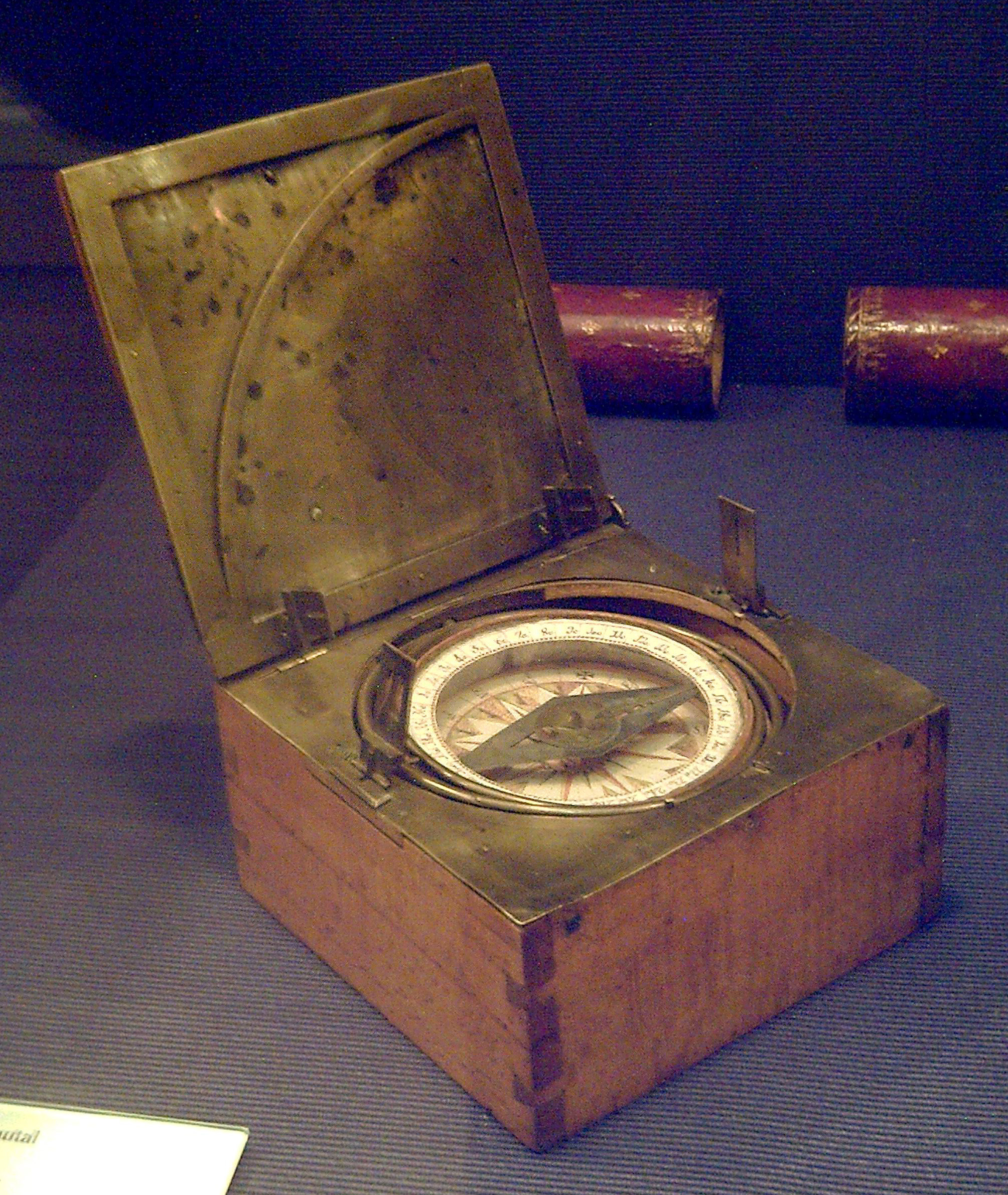
18th-century azimuthal compass held in the National Archaeological Museum of Spain

An azimuth compass (or azimuthal compass) is a nautical instrument used to measure the magnetic azimuth, the angle of the arc on the horizon between the direction of the Sun or some other celestial object and the magnetic north. This can be compared to the true azimuth obtained by astronomical observation to determine the magnetic declination, the amount by which the reading of a ship's compass must be adjusted to obtain an accurate reading. Azimuth compasses were important in the period before development of the reliable chronometers needed to determine a vessel's exact position from astronomical observations.

== Theory ==
The azimuth is the angle formed between a reference direction (North) and a line from the observer to a point of interest projected on the same plane as the reference direction

In navigation, the true azimuth of a heavenly body is the arc of the horizon between the point where a vertical plane containing the observer and the heavenly body intersects the horizon and the direction of true north. The magnetic azimuth is the arc between the point on the horizon below the heavenly body and the direction of magnetic north.

When the latitude and date are known, the bearing of the sun at sunrise or sunset relative to true north can be readily determined. If the Sun is observed at some time between sunrise and sunset, its altitude must also be recorded to calculate the true azimuth. The true azimuth may be compared to the magnetic azimuth to find the magnetic declination, the angle between the direction that the compass indicates as north and the true north direction.

== Compass designs ==
An azimuth compass is a magnetic compass where the circumference of the card is divided into 360 degrees. It has two sights, diametrically opposite each other, through which the Sun, planet or star is viewed. The sun is typically observed when the Sun's center is about one solar diameter above the horizon. (Note: When the lowest part of the Sun is slightly more than half of the Sun's diameter above the horizon, the center of the Sun will in fact lie almost on the horizon. This is due to the refraction of the Sun's rays by the atmosphere.) Typically the compass will have a stop in the side of the box, which the observer pushes when the Sun is lined up in the sights. This fixes the compass card, from which the magnetic azimuth or amplitude can be read. (Note: The magnetic amplitude refers to the arc from the object's projection on the horizon to the magnetic east or west.)

The sights may consist of two vanes, one with a narrow slit and the other with a wider slit bisected by a thread. The observer looks towards the Sun, seen through a dark glass, lining up the thread and the narrow slit on the center of the Sun. Another arrangement has a vertical bar on one vane and a slit bisected by a thread on the other. The instrument is aligned with the Sun when the shadow of the thread falls on the vertical bar. Yet another design has a magnifying glass on one vane that focuses the rays of the Sun on the opposite vane.

Meridional azimuth compasses included a universal equatorial sundial. By setting the date and latitude, the true north and the magnetic variation could be read from the instrument without the need for calculation. With the iron vessels introduced in the 19th century the azimuth compass would be mounted on a pedestal at a neutral point where the readings would not be affected by magnetism of the vessel.

== Applications ==
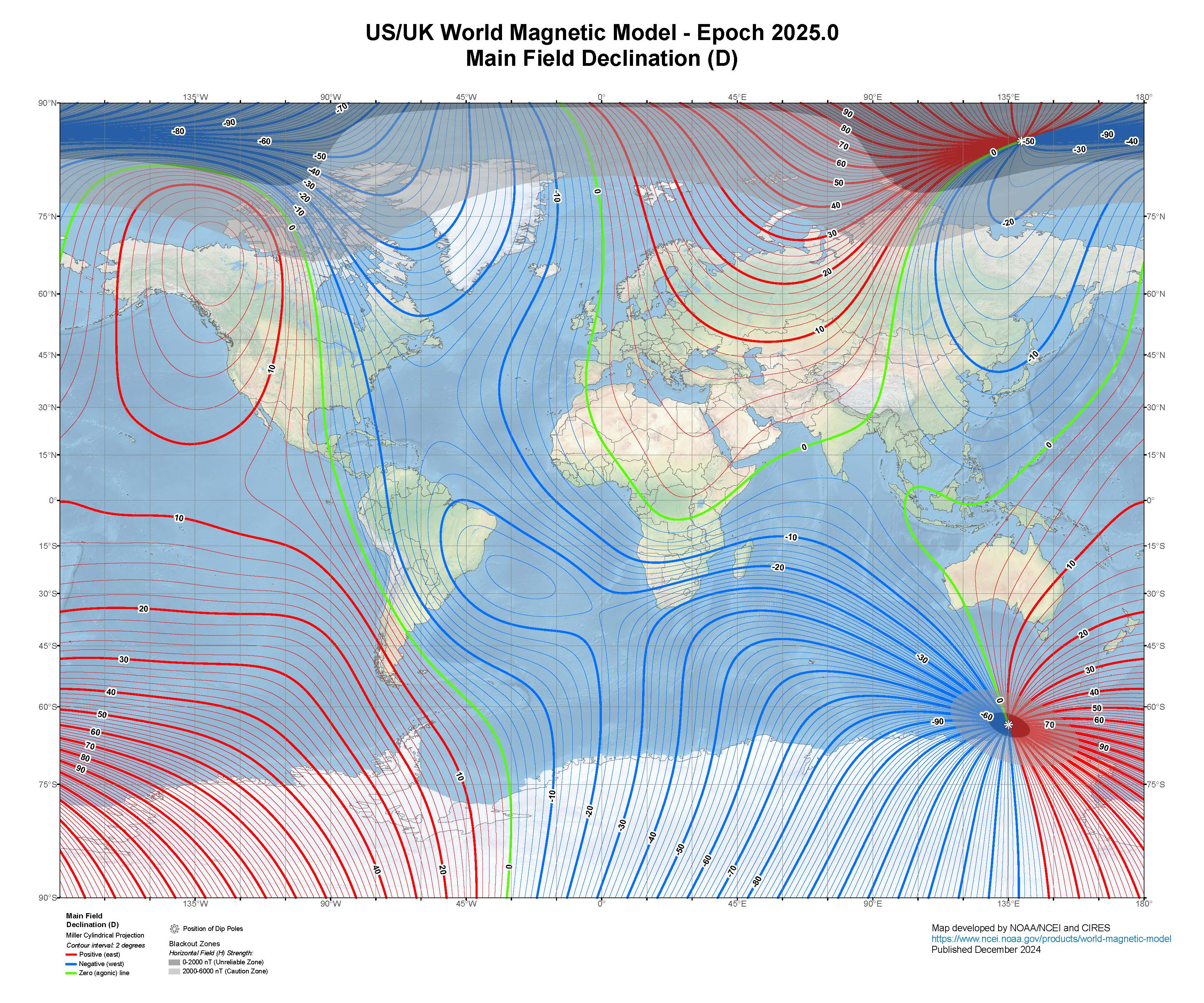
A map showing lines of equal magnetic declination in late 2024

Early navigators in the northern hemisphere could calculate latitude relatively easily when the night sky was clear by observing the elevation of Polaris, a star that is very close to the north celestial pole. However, calculating longitude was impossible until chronometers that could keep time accurately throughout a long voyage were developed. In 1588 King Philip II of Spain (1556–1598) offered a large reward to anyone who could find a practical solution to determining longitude.

A novel approach, apparently originating with the Jesuit missionary Christoforo Borri, was to create charts that mapped points of equal magnetic declination. (Note: Magnetic declination is the angle between true north, the direction of the pole star, and magnetic north as indicated by a magnetic compass.) With an accurate reading of the latitude and the magnetic declination the navigator could determine their longitude using the chart. A drawback to this approach is that magnetic variations change over time, so the charts would need constant revision.

The azimuth compass still had great value in letting the master of a ship determine how far the magnetic compass varied from true north, so he could set a more accurate course while following a line of constant latitude or using dead reckoning to navigate. In 1795 a British First Rate ship would have up to eight compasses, of which one was an improved steering compass. This azimuth compass may have been specialized for the purpose of measuring magnetic variation through taking readings from stars, and used to determine the accuracy of the other compasses.

== Instruments ==
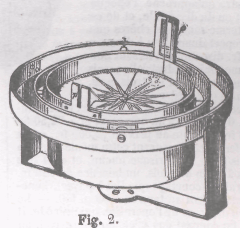
An example of an azimuth compass. The visors of unequal height allow sighting of objects above the horizon.

An azimuthal compass was described in 1736, but the inventor was not named. Azimuth compasses were sometimes large, with a brass case mounted in gimbals containing the rose, and sights on top of the case. Walter Hayes, Richard Glynne and Benjamin Ayres (died c. 1775) made accurate large azimuth compasses. Henry Gregory (1744–1782) had an establishment known as "The Azimuth Compass" in Leadenhall Street, London. He supplied an azimuth compass designed by Gowin Knight to Joseph Banks for the voyage of HMS Resolution commanded by Captain James Cook in 1772. The instrument cost £80.0.0.

On 6 February 1808 the American sealer Topaz, commanded by Captain Mayhew Folger, arrived at Pitcairn Island to take on fresh water. There he found thirty-five survivors of the mutiny on HMS Bounty led by John Adams, who gave Folger HMS Bounty's azimuth compass and chronometer.
