= HMS Resolution (1771) =

Sloop of the Royal Navy

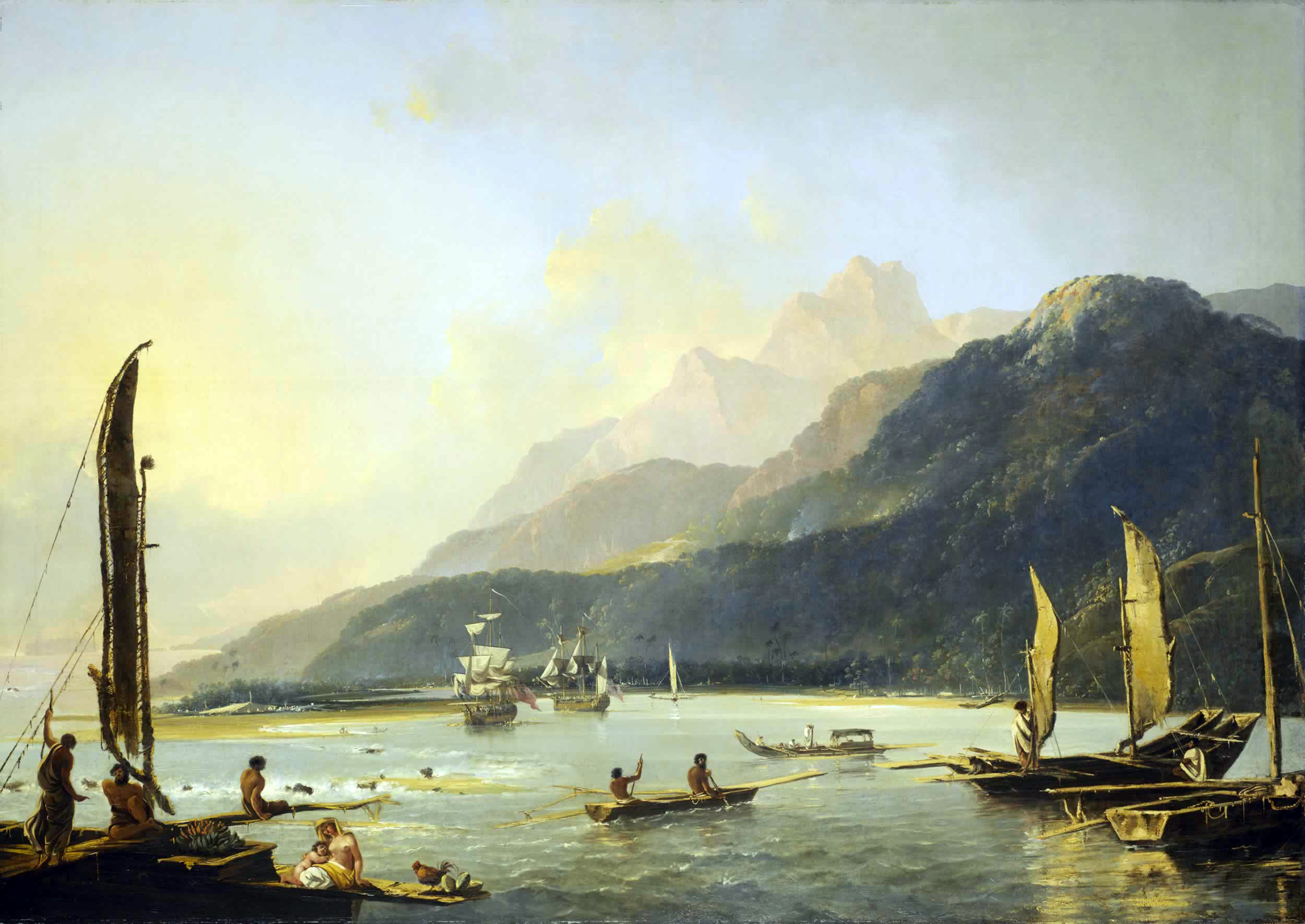
- Resolution and Adventure with fishing craft in Matavai Bay by William Hodges, painted 1776, shows the two ships at anchor in Tahiti in August 1773.

History

Great Britain
- Name: HMS Resolution
- Builder: Thomas Fishburn, Whitby
- Launched: 1770
- Acquired: November 1771 as Marquis of Granby
- Renamed: Renamed HMS Drake in November 1771; Renamed HMS Resolution on 25 December 1771
- Fate: Unknown, last sighted 5 June 1783. Fate disputed.

General characteristics
- Class & type: ex-mercantile collier
- Tons burthen: 462 bm
- Length: 110 ft 8 in (33.73 m) overall; 93 ft 6 in (28.50 m) keel
- Beam: 30 ft 6 in (9.30 m)
- Draught: 13 ft 1 in (3.99 m)
- Propulsion: Sails
- Complement: 112, including 20 marines
- Armament: 12 × 6-pdrs; 12 × 1/2-pdr swivels

HMS Resolution was a sloop of the Royal Navy, a converted merchant collier purchased by the Navy and adapted, in which Captain James Cook made his second and third voyages of exploration in the Pacific. She impressed him enough that he called her "the ship of my choice", and "the fittest for service of any I have seen". The Resolution was the first vessel to cross both the Arctic and Antarctic circles.

== Purchase and refitting ==
Resolution began her career as the North Sea collier Marquis of Granby, launched at Whitby in 1770, and purchased by the Royal Navy in 1771 for £4,151 (equivalent to £605,726 today). She was originally registered as HMS Drake, but fearing this would upset the Spanish, she was soon renamed Resolution, on 25 December 1771. She was fitted out at Deptford with the most advanced navigational aids of the day, including an azimuth compass made by Henry Gregory, ice anchors, and the latest apparatus for distilling small, supplemental amounts of fresh water from sea water. Her armament consisted of twelve 6-pounder guns and 12 swivel guns. At his own expense Cook had brass door-hinges installed in the great cabin. It was originally planned that the naturalist Joseph Banks and an appropriate entourage would sail with Cook, so a heightened waist, an additional upper deck and a raised poop deck were built to suit Banks. This refit cost £10,080.12.9d. However, in sea trials the ship was found to be top-heavy, and under Admiralty instructions the offending structures were removed in a second refit at Sheerness, at a further cost of £882.3.0d. Banks subsequently refused to travel under the resulting "adverse conditions" and Johann Reinhold Forster and his son, George, replaced him.

== Cook's second voyage ==
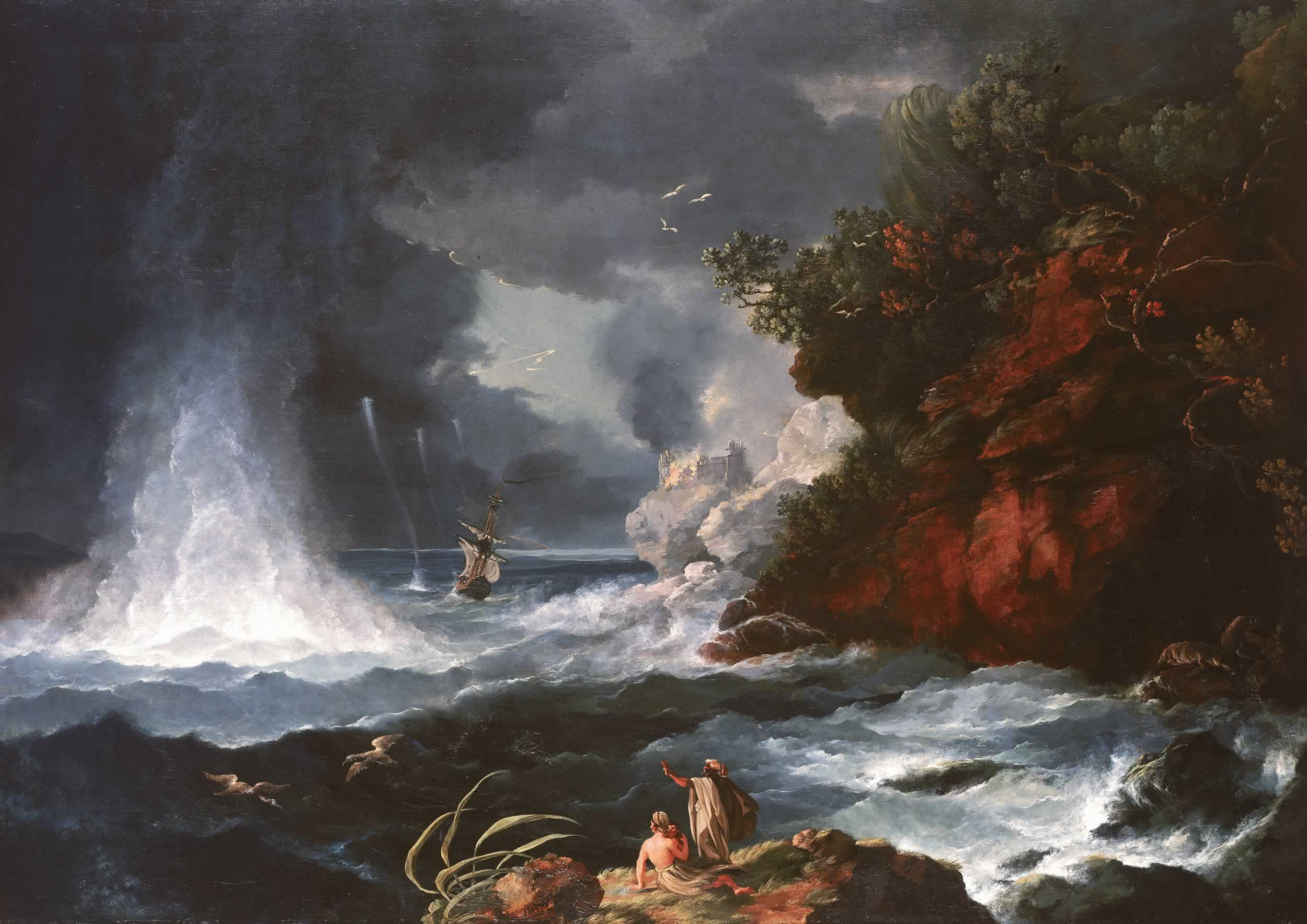
A View of Cape Stephens in Cook's Straits with Waterspout by William Hodges

Resolution departed Sheerness on 21 June 1772, carrying 118 people, including 20 volunteers who had sailed on Cook's first voyage in HMS Endeavour in 1768–1771, and two years of provisions.^{[a]} She joined HMS Adventure at Plymouth and the two ships departed English waters on 13 July 1772.

Resolution's first port of call was at Funchal in the Madeira Islands, which she reached on 1 August. Cook gave high praise to her sailing qualities in a report to the Admiralty from Funchal Roads, writing that she "steers, works, sails well and is remarkably stiff and seems to promise to be a dry and very easy ship in the sea". The ship was reprovisioned with fresh water, beef, fruit and onions, and after a further provisioning stop in the Cape Verde Islands two weeks later, set sail due south toward the Cape of Good Hope. Several of the crew had brought monkeys aboard as pets, but Cook had them thrown overboard to prevent their droppings from fouling the ship.

On his first voyage Cook had calculated longitude by the usual method of lunars, but on her second voyage the Board of Longitude sent a highly qualified astronomer, William Wales, with Cook and entrusted him with a new marine chronometer, the K1, recently completed by Larcum Kendall, together with three chronometers made by John Arnold. Kendall's K1 was remarkably accurate and was to prove to be most efficient in determining longitude on board Resolution.

On 17 January 1773, Resolution was the first ship to cross the Antarctic Circle and crossed twice more on the voyage. The third crossing, on 3 February 1774, was the most southerly penetration, reaching latitude 71°10′ South at longitude 106°54′ West. Resolution thus proved Alexander Dalrymple's Terra Australis Incognita to be a myth. She returned to Britain in 1775 and was then paid off.

== Cook's third voyage ==
She was recommissioned in February 1776 for Cook's third voyage, which began on 12 July 1776, departing from Plymouth, England, during which Resolution crossed the Arctic Circle on 17 August 1778, and again crossed it on 19 July 1779, under the command of Charles Clerke after Cook's death in Hawaii. She arrived back in Britain on 4 October 1780, under the command of John Gore, after Clerk's death on 22 August, 1779.

== Later service and loss ==
In 1780, Resolution was converted into an armed transport and sailed for the East Indies in March 1781. Sphinx and Annibal of Suffren's (French) squadron captured Resolution on 9 June 1782. In early July 1782, during the run-up of the Battle of Negapatam, Suffren sent Resolution to Manila to purchase spare spars, food and ammunition to resupply his fleet. She then sailed on 22 July 1782 and was never seen again.

On 5 June 1783, Suffren wrote that Resolution had last been seen in the Sunda Strait, and that he suspected she had either foundered or fallen into the hands of the English. An item from the Melbourne Argus, 25 February 1879, said that she ended her days as a Portuguese coal-hulk at Rio de Janeiro, but this has never been confirmed. Viscount Galway, a Governor-General of New Zealand, owned a ship's figurehead described as that of Resolution, but a photograph of it does not agree with the figurehead depicted in Holman's famous watercolour of her.

Alternatively, in 1789 she may have been renamed Général Conway, in November 1790 Amis Réunis, and in 1792 Liberté. Martin Dugard's biography of Cook, Farther Than Any Man, published in 2001, states: "Her fate, by some cruel twist of historical irony, is as incredible as Endeavour's – she [Resolution] was sold to the French, rechristened La Liberté, and transformed into a whaler, then ended her days rotting in Newport Harbor. She settled to the bottom just a mile from Endeavour." (p. 281, Epilogue)

In 1881, the British Consul in Alexandria, looking from the Ras El Tin Palace, pointed out a ship in the harbour he identified as the Resolution, to William N. Armstrong, attendant to Hawaiian King David Kalākaua during his trip around the world.

== See also ==
- European and American voyages of scientific exploration

== Notes ==
^[a]Provisions loaded at the outset of the voyage included 60,000 pounds of hardtack, 7,637 pieces of salted beef and 14,200 pieces of pork, 1,900 pounds of suet, 3,102 pounds of raisins, 300 gallons of oatmeal, 210 gallons of olive oil and 2,000 pounds of sugar. Antiscorbutic supplies comprised 640 gallons of malt, 20,000 pounds of sauerkraut, 4000 pounds of salted cabbage, 400 pounds of mustard and 30 gallons of carrot marmalade. Alcohol supplies included 19 tons of beer and 642 gallons of wine.

== Bibliography ==
- Beaglehole, J.C., ed. (1959). The Journals of Captain James Cook on His Voyages of Discovery II, vol. I: The Voyage of the Resolution and Adventure 1772–1775. Cambridge University Press. OCLC 299995193.
- Colledge, J. J.; Warlow, Ben (2006) [1969]. Ships of the Royal Navy: The Complete Record of All Fighting Ships of the Royal Navy from the 15th Century to the Present (3rd Rev ed.). London: Chatham Publishing. ISBN 978-1-86176-281-8. OCLC 67375475.
- Dugard, Martin (2001). Farther Than Any Man: The Rise and Fall of Captain James Cook. New York: Washington Square Press. ISBN 978-0-7434-0069-5.
- Hough, Richard (1995). Captain James Cook. Hodder and Stoughton. ISBN 978-0340825563.
- Paine, Lincoln P. (1997). Ships of the World: an Historical Encyclopedia. Boston: Houghton Mifflin. ISBN 978-0-395-71556-7.
- Sides, Hampton (2024). The Wide Wide Sea: Imperial Ambition, First Contact, and the Fateful Final Voyage of Captain James Cook. Doubleday. ISBN 9780385544764.
- Winfield, Rif (2007). British Warships of the Age of Sail 1714–1792: Design, Construction, Careers and Fates. Barnsley: Seaforth Publishing. ISBN 978-1861762955.
