= William Bewley (physician) =

English physician

William Bewley (1726–1783) was an English physician.

== Life ==
A friend of Charles Burney, he was a native of Massingham, in Norfolk, where he practised medicine. He made for himself some scientific reputation and was a friend of Joseph Priestley, whom he once visited at Birmingham.

It is through his friendship with Dr. Burney that his name has been preserved. He is mentioned more than once in Madame d'Arblay's Memoirs of Burney, her father. We are told that on account of the simplicity of his life and the nature of his pursuits he was known as 'the philosopher of Massingham' and that he was as remarkable for his wit and conversational powers as for the extent of his knowledge of science and literature.

Bewley died at Burney's house in St. Martin's Street, Leicester Square, London, on his birthday, 5 September 1783. An obituary notice written by Burney for the Gentleman's Magazine was in Madame d'Arblay's Memoirs. It is here said that "Mr. Bewley for more than twenty years supplied the editor of the "Monthly Review" with an examination of innumerable works in science and articles of foreign literature, written with a force, spirit, candour, and — when the subject afforded opportunity — humour, not often found in critical discussions."

== Sources ==
- Gentleman's Magazine, vol. 53, pt. 2 (1783), p. 805.
