= Henry Gregory (cricketer) =

English cricketer

Personal information
- Full name: Henry Vernon Gregory
- Born: 1 January 1936 (age 90); Manchester, Lancashire, England
- Batting: Right-handed
- Bowling: Leg break

Domestic team information
- Years: Team
- 1960: Sussex
- 1957: Cheshire

Career statistics
Competition	First-class
Matches	1
Runs scored	18
Batting average	9.00
100s/50s	–/–
Top score	14
Balls bowled	60
Wickets	–
Bowling average	–
5 wickets in innings	–
10 wickets in match	–
Best bowling	–
Catches/stumpings	–/–
- Source: Cricinfo, 27 November 2011

Henry Vernon Gregory (born 18 January 1936) is a former English cricketer. Gregory was a right-handed batsman who bowled leg break. He was born at Manchester, Lancashire.

Gregory made a single Minor Counties Championship appearance for Cheshire against the Warwickshire Second XI. He later made a single first-class appearance for Sussex against Cambridge University at Fenner's in 1960. He was dismissed for 4 runs in Sussex's first-innings by Alan Hurd, while in their second-innings, he was dismissed for 14 runs by Michael Willard. Cambridge University won the match by 4 wickets. This was his only major appearance for Sussex.
