= Henry Gregory (instrument maker) =

- Born: 1744
- Died: 1782 (aged 37–38)
- Occupation: Mathematical instrument maker

Henry Gregory (1744–1782) was an English mathematical and optical instrument maker. Gregory was apprenticed to John Fowler in 1732 and was himself in business from c. 1750–1792 from premises in Francis Court, Clerkenwell, London and an establishment known as "The Azimuth Compass" in Leadenhall Street, London. His company later became known as Gregory and Son.

Gregory manufactured navigational instruments, including quadrants of the type invented by John Hadley and compasses. One of his azimuth compasses traveled with the explorer James Cook on his second voyage to the southern Pacific Ocean in 1772–1775. An azimuth compass is a compass fitted with vertical sights, used to take the magnetic azimuth of a star or planet. Surviving examples of the azimuth compass exist in the collections of the National Maritime Museum, Greenwich and the Smithsonian National Museum of American History.
