= List of Guggenheim Fellowships awarded in 1982 =

Two hundred and seventy-seven scholars, artists, and scientists received Guggenheim Fellowships in 1982. $5,070,000 was disbursed between the recipients, who were chosen from an applicant pool of 3,200. University of California, Berkeley had the most winners on its faculty (12).

== 1982 U.S. and Canadian Fellows ==
Category	Field of Study	Fellow	Institutional association	Research topic	Notes	Ref
Creative Arts	Choreography	Viola Farber	Le Centre National de Dance Contemporaine d’Angers	Made-for-television movie January		
Creative Arts	Choreography	Deborah Hay	Deborah Hay Dance Company	Expanding the repertory of her dance company		
Creative Arts	Choreography	Dana Reitz		Choreography		
Creative Arts	Choreography	Nina Diana Wiener	Nina Wiener and Dancers	Choreography		
Creative Arts	Drama & Performance Art	Steve Carter		Playwriting		
Creative Arts	Drama & Performance Art	Wendy Kesselman		Playwriting		
Creative Arts	Drama & Performance Art	Miguel Piñero		Playwriting		
Creative Arts	Fiction	T. Alan Broughton	University of Vermont	Writing his fourth novel		
Creative Arts	Fiction	Jerome Charyn	Princeton University	Writing		
Creative Arts	Fiction	Robb Forman Dew		The Time of Her Life (published 1984)		
Creative Arts	Fiction	Laura Furman	Southern Methodist University	Assembling Watch Time Fly (published 1984); novel-writing		
Creative Arts	Fiction	Shelby Hearon		Afternoon of a Fawn (published 1983)		
Creative Arts	Fiction	Mark Helprin		Writing		
Creative Arts	Fiction	John Keeble	Eastern Washington University	Writing		
Creative Arts	Fiction	Maxine Hong Kingston		Writing		
Creative Arts	Fiction	David Plante	University of Tulsa (in residence)	Writing		
Creative Arts	Fiction	Tobias Wolff	Syracuse University	Writing		
Creative Arts	Film	Laurie Anderson		Art and film		
Creative Arts	Film	Carolyn Brown	SUNY Purchase	Filmmaking and choreography		
Creative Arts	Film	Christine Choy		Film about a Chinese community in the Mississippi Delta		
Creative Arts	Film	Loni Ding	UC Berkeley			
Creative Arts	Film	Pat Ferrero	San Francisco State University			
Creative Arts	Film	Marian Marzynski	Governors State University	Documentary about Polish immigration to the United States		
Creative Arts	Film	Allen D. Moore				
Creative Arts	Fine Arts	Robert Ackerman		Painting		
Creative Arts	Fine Arts	Houston Conwill	SUNY at Old Westbury	Sculpture: The Joyful Mysteries 1984-2034		
Creative Arts	Fine Arts	Tom Doyle	Queens College	Sculpture: Learned to use a two-person chainsaw		
Creative Arts	Fine Arts	Martin Facey	Santa Monica College	Painting		
Creative Arts	Fine Arts	Richard Fishman	Brown University	Sculpture		
Creative Arts	Fine Arts	George Herms		Sculpture		
Creative Arts	Fine Arts	Terence La Noue	La Guardia Community College	Painting		
Creative Arts	Fine Arts	Leo Manso	Art Students League of New York	Printmaking		
Creative Arts	Fine Arts	Catherine Murphy		Painting		
Creative Arts	Fine Arts	Martin L. Puryear	University of Illinois Chicago	Sculpture		
Creative Arts	Fine Arts	Joan Snyder		Painting		
Creative Arts	Fine Arts	Pat Steir		Painting		
Creative Arts	Fine Arts	George Trakas		Sculpture		
Creative Arts	Fine Arts	Hannah Wilke	School of Visual Arts	Sculpture		
Creative Arts	Fine Arts	Susan Wilmarth-Rabineau		Painting		
Creative Arts	Music Composition	Ran Blake	New England Conservatory of Music	Composing		
Creative Arts	Music Composition	Gerald Levinson	Swarthmore College	Balinese music		
Creative Arts	Music Composition	Donald Martino	Brandeis University	Composing	Also won in 1967 and 1973	
Creative Arts	Music Composition	Meredith Monk	The Meredith Monk & Vocal Ensemble	A theater piece	Also won in 1972	
Creative Arts	Music Composition	Thea Musgrave		Composing	Also won in 1974	
Creative Arts	Music Composition	Stephen Harrison Paulus	Minnesota Composers Forum	Composing		
Creative Arts	Music Composition	Daniel J. Perlongo	Indiana University of Pennsylvania	Large work for orchestras		
Creative Arts	Music Composition	Bernard Rands	UC San Diego	Composing		
Creative Arts	Music Composition	Bruce Saylor	Queens College	Composing		
Creative Arts	Music Composition	Nicholas C. K. Thorne	American Academy in Rome (visiting)	Composing		
Creative Arts	Music Composition	Barry Lloyd Vercoe	Massachusetts Institute of Technology	Development of the synthetic performer, "a real-time interactive accompaniment system"		
Creative Arts	Photography	Marilyn Bridges		Aerial photography		
Creative Arts	Photography	Bill Dane			Also won in 1973	
Creative Arts	Photography	Barbara Kasten	Orange Coast College	Made photographs in New York's Polaroid 20x24 studio		
Creative Arts	Photography	William Larson	Temple University			
Creative Arts	Photography	Anne Noggle	University of New Mexico	Aging process as revealed in the faces of Americans, mostly middle-class woman		
Creative Arts	Photography	Thomas Roma			Also won in 1991	
Creative Arts	Photography	Leo Rubinfien	Fordham University			
Creative Arts	Photography	Joel Sternfeld	Stockton State College	American Prospects, day-to-day life for Americans across the country	Also won in 1978	
Creative Arts	Poetry	David Budbill		Writing		
Creative Arts	Poetry	Jared Carter	Indiana University	Traveling through Indiana to gather folk tales and state history		
Creative Arts	Poetry	Amy Clampitt		Writing		
Creative Arts	Poetry	Jorie Graham	California State University, Humboldt and Columbia University	Writing		
Creative Arts	Poetry	Linda Gregg		Writing		
Creative Arts	Poetry	Allen R. Grossman	Brandeis University	Writing		
Creative Arts	Poetry	Brad E. Leithauser	Kyoto Comparative Law Center (visiting)	Writing		
Creative Arts	Poetry	Larry P. Levis	University of Iowa	Fourth book of poems		
Creative Arts	Poetry	Vern Rutsala	Lewis and Clark College	Writing		
Creative Arts	Poetry	Pamela Stewart		Writing		
Creative Arts	Video & Audio	Ernest Gusella		Video		
Humanities	American Literature	Martha Banta	University of Washington	Images of women in 19th-century American literary works		
Humanities	American Literature	Sharon Cameron	Johns Hopkins University	Thoreau's journals		
Humanities	American Literature	William B. Dillingham	Emory University	Completing his three-volume study of Herman Melville		
Humanities	American Literature	Edgar A. Dryden	University of Arizona	Problems of reading and the development of the American novel		
Humanities	Architecture, Planning, & Design	Manuel Castells	UC Berkeley	Local government, participatory planning, and the quality of life		
Humanities	Architecture, Planning, & Design	Robert Mark	Princeton University	Reinterpretation of ancient Roman structure		
Humanities	Bibliography	W. H. Bond	Harvard University	Thomas Hollis V		
Humanities	Bibliography	Richard N. Schwab	UC Davis	Application of the cyclotron for studying the authenticity of historical books		
Humanities	Biography	A. Scott Berg		Samuel Goldwyn		
Humanities	British History	Wallace T. MacCaffrey	Harvard University	Elizabethan politics, 1588-1603	Also won in 1956	
Humanities	British History	Frank M. Turner	Yale University	History of British intellectual life, 1776-1914		
Humanities	Classics	William V. Harris	Columbia University	Literacy and illiteracy in the Roman world		
Humanities	Classics	Thomas G. Rosenmeyer	UC Berkeley	Stoic physics and the Senecan tradition in drama	Also won in 1966	
Humanities	Dance Studies	Robert Greskovic		Essays on dance photographs		
Humanities	East Asian Studies	George Elison	Indiana University	Rule of 16th-century Japan		
Humanities	East Asian Studies	Jurgis Elisonas	Indiana University			
Humanities	Economic History	Donald N. McCloskey	University of Iowa	Persistence of English open fields, and of the rhetoric of economics		
Humanities	Economic History	John J. McCusker	University of Maryland, College Park	Bibliographical study of early commercial and financial newspapers		
Humanities	English Literature	Janet Adelman	UC Berkeley	Figure of the mother in Shakepeare's plays		
Humanities	English Literature	John B. Bender	Stanford University	Prison imagery and narrative form in 18th-century literature and art		
Humanities	English Literature	William C. Dowling	University of New Mexico	The epistolary moment in English verse		
Humanities	English Literature	Stephen J. Greenblatt	UC Berkeley	Shakespeare and authority	Also won in 1974	
Humanities	English Literature	Phyllis Grosskurth	University of Toronto	Biography of Melanie Klein	Also won in 1977	
Humanities	English Literature	Robert Halsband	University of Illinois, Urbana-Champaign	Literary illustration in 18th-century England	Also won in 1968	
Humanities	English Literature	James R. Kincaid	University of Colorado Boulder	Victorian child-love	Also won in 19Andrea Tonacci73	
Humanities	English Literature	Coral Lansbury	Rutgers University	Victorian literary and social responses to vivisection		
Humanities	English Literature	A. Walton Litz	Princeton University	History of literary modernism in England and America, 1909-1923		
Humanities	English Literature	Maynard Mack	Yale University	Life of Alexander Pope	Also won in 1942 and 1964	
Humanities	English Literature	Gerald C. Monsman	Duke University	Psychology and dream in 19th-century imaginative prose		
Humanities	English Literature	Mary Ann Radzinowicz	Cornell University	John Milton's epics and the Psalms		
Humanities	English Literature	Leslie Tannenbaum	Ohio State University	Biblical tradition in William Blake's later prophecies		
Humanities	Film, Video, & Radio Studies	Ian Jarvie	York University	Film and the philosophers		
Humanities	Film, Video, & Radio Studies	Elizabeth Kendall	New York University	Hollywood lyric comedy of the 1930s		
Humanities	Fine Arts Research	Janet Cox-Rearick	Hunter College	Italian art at the court of France, 1515-1547		
Humanities	Fine Arts Research	Patricia Hills	Boston University	Painting and social concern in America in the 1930s		
Humanities	Fine Arts Research	Gabriel Paul Weisberg	University of Pittsburgh	Book on Samuel Bing and the evolution of Art Nouveau		
Humanities	Folklore & Popular Culture	Bruce A. Rosenberg	Brown University	Folklore methodology and literary criticism		
Humanities	Folklore & Popular Culture	Candace Slater	University of Pennsylvania	Literature of pilgrimage		
Humanities	French History	Lynn A. Hunt	UC Berkeley	Political culture of the French Revolution		
Humanities	French History	John Hearsey McMillan Salmon	Bryn Mawr College	French Romantic vision of history		
Humanities	French Literature	Ursula Franklin	Grand Valley State Colleges	Research on two 19th-century poets who wrote while exiled in Germany and France		
Humanities	French Literature	François Rigolot	Princeton University	Text in the French Renaissance		
Humanities	French Literature	English Showalter Jr.	Rutgers University	Edition of the letters of Madame de Graffigny		
Humanities	General Nonfiction	Stanley Crouch		Essays on American culture		
Humanities	General Nonfiction	Carlos Franqui		Study of exile		
Humanities	General Nonfiction	William A. Kuhns	University of Ottawa	The emerging information culture		
Humanities	General Nonfiction	Eric Larrabee	Columbia University	American military leadership in World War II		
Humanities	General Nonfiction	Cynthia Ozick		Fiction and essays		
Humanities	German & East European History	Gordon A. Craig		The Zurich exiles, 1849-1863	Also won in 1969	
Humanities	German & Scandinavian Literature	Thomas P. Saine	UC Irvine	The impact of the French Revolution on German intellectuals		
Humanities	History of Science & Technology	Thomas Leroy Hankins	University of Washington	Exact sciences and the origins of the Enlightenment		
Humanities	History of Science & Technology	Sandra Herbert	University of Maryland, Baltimore	Charles Darwin's "simple" geology		
Humanities	History of Science & Technology	Nancy G. Siraisi	Hunter College and Graduate Center CUNY	Place of Avicenna in Renaissance medicine in Padua, Italy		
Humanities	History of Science & Technology	Frank J. Sulloway	Harvard University	Family constellations and scientific revolutions		
Humanities	Iberian & Latin American History	William A. Christian Jr.		Religious visions in modern Spain		
Humanities	Iberian & Latin American History	Richard L. Kagan	Johns Hopkins University	El Greco of Toledo		
Humanities	Intellectual & Cultural History	Peter Heller	SUNY at Buffalo	Freudians and Freud in Vienna, 1928-1932		
Humanities	Italian History	MacGregor Knox	University of Rochester	Foreign and domestic policy in Fascist Italy and National Socialist Germany		
Humanities	Latin American Literature	Jaime Alazraki	Harvard University	Fantastic fiction in Argentina	Also won in 1971	
Humanities	Latin American Literature	Roberto González Echevarría	Yale University	Narrative rhetoric in Spanish America		
Humanities	Linguistics	Ann Banfield	UC Berkeley	Tense and language of clockwork and consciousness		
Humanities	Linguistics	Victoria E. R. Bricker	Tulane University	Pronominal inflection in the Maya hieroglyphs		
Humanities	Linguistics	Joseph H. Greenberg	Stanford University	Processes of change in grammatical systems	Also won in 1954	
Humanities	Linguistics	Irmengard Rauch	University of Illinois Urbana-Champaign	Introduction to Old Saxon		
Humanities	Literary Criticsm	Lilian R. Furst	University of Texas at Dallas	Irony in the 18th- and 19th-century European narrative		
Humanities	Literary Criticsm	Sandra M. Gilbert	UC Davis	The place of the woman writer in the 20th century		
Humanities	Literary Criticsm	Wendy Steiner	University of Pennsylvania	Connections between modern literature and painting		
Humanities	Medieval History	John V. A. Fine Jr.	University of Michigan	History of the later medieval Balkans		
Humanities	Medieval History	Lester K. Little	Smith College	Monastic liturgical maledictions from 850 to 1150 AD		
Humanities	Medieval Literature	Jonathan Beck	Emory University	Theater and propaganda in the Middle Ages and Reformation		
Humanities	Medieval Literature	Charles B. Faulhaber	UC Berkeley	Bibliographical studies of Latin culture in medieval Spain		
Humanities	Medieval Literature	John M. Fyler	Tufts University	Language and the declining world in Chaucer's poetry		
Humanities	Medieval Literature	Siegfried Wenzel	University of Pennsylvania	Early English lyric	Also won in 1968	
Humanities	Music Research	Lawrence A. Gushee	University of Illinois, Urbana-Champaign	The Creole Band, 1914-1918	Also won in 1970	
Humanities	Music Research	Gary A. Tomlinson	University of Pennsylvania	Monteverdi and the end of the Renaissance		
Humanities	Music Research	Robert Stewart Winter	UCLA	Romantic piano		
Humanities	Music Research	Craig Milton Wright	Yale University	10 centuries of music and ceremony at Notre-Dame de Paris		
Humanities	Near Eastern Studies	David O'Connor	University of Pennsylvania	Urbanism in ancient Egypt		
Humanities	Near Eastern Studies	Edith Porada	Columbia University	Catalogue of Western Asiatic cylinder seals of the second millennium BC in the British Museum	Also won in 1950	
Humanities	Philosophy	Arthur C. Danto	Columbia University	Concept of representation and the human sciences	Also won in 1969	
Humanities	Philosophy	Arthur I. Fine	Northwestern University	Einstein's attitute towards the quantum theory, and related conceptual issues		
Humanities	Philosophy	Paul D. Guyer	University of Pittsburgh (visiting)	Epistemology and psychology in Kant's model of mind		
Humanities	Philosophy	James F. Ross	University of Pennsylvania	Embodied consciousness and Judeo-Christian religion		
Humanities	Photography Studies	Estelle Jussim	Simmons College	Biography of Alvin Langdon Coburn		
Humanities	Religion	Bruce Lincoln	University of Minnesota	Death and the soul's fate in Indo-European thought		
Humanities	Religion	Margaret R. Miles	Harvard University	Visual formulations of Christian theology in the Middle Ages		
Humanities	Religion	Gary G. Porton	University of Illinois, Urbana-Champaign	Image of the non-Jew in rabbinic literature		
Humanities	Renaissance History	Robert Bireley	Loyola University of Chicago	Anti-machiavellianism, counter-reformation, and the Baroque		
Humanities	Russian History	W. Bruce Lincoln	Northern Illinois University	Russia in World War I		
Humanities	Russian History	William G. Rosenberg	University of Michigan	Labor and politics in revolutionary Russia		
Humanities	South Asian Studies	David Dean Shulman	Hebrew University of Jerusalem	Social symbolism of medieval South India		
Humanities	Spanish & Portuguese Literature	Robert M. Flores	University of British Columbia	Cervantes' orthography		
Humanities	Spanish & Portuguese Literature	Lily Litvak	University of Texas Austin	Research for a book on exoticism in Spanish art and literature at the turn of the century		
Humanities	Theatre Arts	Gordon Davidson	Center Theatre Group/Mark Taper Forum	Directing in American theater, 1961-1981		
Humanities	Theatre Arts	James D. Ellis	Mount Holyoke College	Perceptions of women in English theater in the 1890s		
Humanities	Theatre Arts	Arthur H. Saxon		Biography of P. T. Barnum	Also won in 1971	
Humanities	Theatre Arts	Don B. Wilmeth	Brown University	19th-century American drama and popular culture		
Humanities	United States History	David A. Hollinger	University of Michigan	America and the vindication of scientific culture		
Humanities	United States History	Robert L. Kelley	UC Santa Barbara	Cultural politics in the US		
Humanities	United States History	Calvin Martin	Rutgers College	Biological conquest of the North American Indian		
Humanities	United States History	William S. McFeely	Mount Holyoke College	Biography about Frederick Douglass		
Humanities	United States History	Richard B. Morris	Columbia University	Forging of the Federal union, 1781-1789	Also won in 1947 and 1961	
Humanities	United States History	Lawrence N. Powell	Tulane University	Southern Republican politics in the age of Reconstruction		
Humanities	United States History	Charles W. Royster	Louisiana State University, Baton Rouge	William Tecumseh Sherman, Stonewall Jackson, and the Civil War		
Humanities	United States History	Darrett B. Rutman	University of New Hampshire	The idea and the reality of community in American history		
Humanities	United States History	Merritt Roe Smith	Massachusetts Institute of Technology	Technology and culture in 19th-century America		
Humanities	United States History	Stephen Saunders Webb	Syracuse University	Marlborough's empire, 1681-1722		
Natural Sciences	Applied Mathematics	Richard C. DiPrima	Rensselaer Polytechnic Institute	Nonlinear stability theory		
Natural Sciences	Applied Mathematics	Bernard J. Matkowsky	Northwestern University	Mathematical studies in combustion theory and in first passage time problems		
Natural Sciences	Applied Mathematics	William T. Silfvast	Bell Laboratories	Plasma energy storage and short-wavelength lasers		
Natural Sciences	Applied Mathematics	John A. Whitehead	Woods Hole Oceanographic Institution	Theoretical and experimental geophysical fluid dynamics		
Natural Sciences	Astronomy & Astrophysics	Donald E. Osterbrock	UC Santa Cruz	Analysis and interpretation of active galactic nuclei	Also won in 1960	
Natural Sciences	Astronomy & Astrophysics	Dimitri A. Papanastassiou	California Institute of Technology	Mass spectrometry and isotopic abundances		
Natural Sciences	Astronomy & Astrophysics	Irwin I. Shapiro	Massachusetts Institute of Technology	Very-long-baseline radio interferometry		
Natural Sciences	Chemistry	Steven A. Adelman	Purdue University	Reaction dynamics in condensed phases		
Natural Sciences	Chemistry	G. Michael Bancroft	University of Western Ontario	Bonding in free gas molecules using synchrotron radiation		
Natural Sciences	Chemistry	Edward M. Eyring	University of Utah	How pure solvents are decomposed by infrared lasers		
Natural Sciences	Chemistry	Michael D. Fayer	Stanford University	Optical interactions in condensed phases		
Natural Sciences	Chemistry	Gregory L. Geoffroy	Pennsylvania State University	Carbon monoxide reduction by transition metals supported by zeolite catalysts		
Natural Sciences	Chemistry	Robert A. Harris	UC Berkeley	Dynamics of handed molecules		
Natural Sciences	Chemistry	Philip M. Johnson	SUNY at Stony Brook	Interaction of laser light with molecules		
Natural Sciences	Chemistry	Ming-Chang Lin	US Naval Research Laboratory and Catholic University of America	Experimental studies in physical chemistry		
Natural Sciences	Chemistry	Thomas J. Meyer	University of North Carolina at Chapel Hill	Electron transfer reaction		
Natural Sciences	Chemistry	Larry L. Miller	University of Minnesota	Controlled chemical modification of solid surfaces		
Natural Sciences	Chemistry	Marion H. O'Leary	University of Wisconsin	Isotope fractionation in plants		
Natural Sciences	Earth Science	Preston Cloud	UC Santa Barbara	Historical geology		
Natural Sciences	Earth Science	Miriam Kastner	UC San Diego	Origin of sedimentary dolomite		
Natural Sciences	Earth Science	David L. Kohlstedt	Cornell University	Development, structure, and sliding of grain boundaries in geologic materials		
Natural Sciences	Earth Science	Sean Carl Solomon	Massachusetts Institute of Technology	Modeling of mid-ocean ridge tectonics and of planetary gravity anomalies		
Natural Sciences	Engineering	John L. Anderson	Carnegie-Mellon University	Theoretical description of chemically driven flows		
Natural Sciences	Engineering	Rafael Luis Bras	Massachusetts Institute of Technology	Similarity, scale, and order in hydrologic processes		
Natural Sciences	Mathematics	George E. Andrews	Pennsylvania State University	Statistical mechanics and partition theory		
Natural Sciences	Mathematics	Edward G. Effros	UCLA	Noncommutative geometry		
Natural Sciences	Mathematics	Anthony W. Knapp	Cornell University	Representation theory		
Natural Sciences	Mathematics	Tai-Ping Liu	University of Maryland, College Park	Shock wave theory and nonlinear hyperbolic equations		
Natural Sciences	Mathematics	George Lusztig	Massachusetts Institute of Technology	Representations of finite groups		
Natural Sciences	Mathematics	Saunders Mac Lane	University of Chicago		Also won in 1947	
Natural Sciences	Medicine & Health	Arthur E. Broadus	Yale University School of Medicine	Isolation of the factor responsible for the hypercalcaemia of malignancy		
Natural Sciences	Medicine & Health	Barry S. Coller	SUNY at Stony Brook	Physiology of platelet membranes		
Natural Sciences	Medicine & Health	Mitchell L. Halperin	University of Toronto	Acid secretion by the kidney and energy metabolism in cancer cells		
Natural Sciences	Medicine & Health	Frederick Naftolin	Yale University School of Medicine	Structure-function relationship in neuroendocrinology		
Natural Sciences	Medicine & Health	J. Edwin Seegmiller	UC San Diego	Role of free radicals in human disease		
Natural Sciences	Molecular & Cellular Biology	John Joseph Cebra	University of Pennsylvania	B-cell differentiation and the regulation of isotope expression		
Natural Sciences	Molecular & Cellular Biology	Seymour S. Cohen	SUNY at Stony Brook	Thomas Cooper and the chemical revolution in America and of the mechanism of ethylene in the ripening of fruit	Also won in 1945	
Natural Sciences	Molecular & Cellular Biology	Alexander N. Glazer	UC Berkeley	Molecular structure of the photosynthetic apparatus	Also won in 1970	
Natural Sciences	Molecular & Cellular Biology	Richard O. Hynes	Massachusetts Institute of Technology	Immunological analysis of the nervous system		
Natural Sciences	Molecular & Cellular Biology	Emanuel Margoliash	Northwestern University	Structure, function, and genetics of cytochrome c		
Natural Sciences	Molecular & Cellular Biology	Robert L. Metzenberg	University of Wisconsin	Homogeneity and diversity in multiple-copy genes		
Natural Sciences	Molecular & Cellular Biology	Randy W. Schekman	UC Berkeley	Role of the secretory process in mitochondrial membrane assembly		
Natural Sciences	Molecular & Cellular Biology	Bennett M. Shapiro	University of Washington	Biochemistry of fertilization		
Natural Sciences	Molecular & Cellular Biology	William Tobey Wickner	UCLA	Localization of proteins within mitochondrial membranes		
Natural Sciences	Neuroscience	Martha Constantine-Paton	Princeton University	Cell surface in the vertebrate retina		
Natural Sciences	Neuroscience	Michael S. Gazzaniga	Cornell University Medical College	Evolution of brain and mind		
Natural Sciences	Organismic Biology & Ecology	Robert M. Fagen	University of Pennsylvania	Evolutionary studies of animal and plant adaptibility		
Natural Sciences	Organismic Biology & Ecology	George B. Johnson	Washington University in St. Louis	Genetic factors influencing mutation rates in drosophila flies		
Natural Sciences	Organismic Biology & Ecology	Patrice Ann Morrow	University of Minnesota	Community consequences of chronic insect stress in eucalyptus forests		
Natural Sciences	Organismic Biology & Ecology	Sheldon Penman	Massachusetts Institute of Technology	Dynamics of skeletal structures in cells		
Natural Sciences	Organismic Biology & Ecology	Ronald J. Prokopy	University of Massachusetts	Insect foraging behavior		
Natural Sciences	Organismic Biology & Ecology	Arthur Winfree	Purdue University	Human body clocks and their pathologies		
Natural Sciences	Physics	James W. Cronin	University of Chicago	High-energy physics	Also won in 1970	
Natural Sciences	Physics	John W. Negele	Massachusetts Institute of Technology	Nuclear many-body theory		
Natural Sciences	Physics	Robert C. Richardson	Cornell University	Ground state of matter	Also won in 1975	
Natural Sciences	Physics	Sunil Kumar Sinha	Argonne National Laboratory	Neuron and X-ray scattering studies of condensed matter		
Natural Sciences	Physics	Alberto Sirlin	New York University	Theoretical particle physics		
Natural Sciences	Plant Sciences	Paul B. Green	Stanford University	Cellular polarity shifts during plant organ formation		
Natural Sciences	Plant Sciences	Andrew D. Hanson	Michigan State University	Environmental control of gene expression in germinating barley seeds		
Natural Sciences	Plant Sciences	Shang Fa Yang	UC Davis	Role of ethylene in plant aging		
Natural Sciences	Statistics	David R. Brillinger	UC Berkeley	Statistical aspects of risk assessment	Also won in 1975	
Natural Sciences	Statistics	Paul Meier	University of Chicago	Statistics in medicine and in the law		
Social Sciences	Anthropology & Cultural Studies	John G. Fleagle	SUNY at Stony Brook	Early anthropoid evolution		
Social Sciences	Anthropology & Cultural Studies	Paul Friedrich	University of Chicago	Connotative and mythic meaning in Proto-Indo-European poetry		
Social Sciences	Anthropology & Cultural Studies	Raymond C. Kelly	University of Michigan	Reinterpretation of the Nuer conquest		
Social Sciences	Anthropology & Cultural Studies	Sherry B. Ortner	University of Michigan	Interpretive history of Sherpa Buddhism		
Social Sciences	Anthropology & Cultural Studies	Valerio Valeri	University of Chicago	Unilateral marriage in eastern Indonesia		
Social Sciences	Economics	Robert J. Barro	University of Rochester	Effects of monetary policy and the government's budget on inflation and real economic activity		
Social Sciences	Economics	Truman F. Bewley	Northwestern University	General equilibrium in a stationary environment with imperfect markets		
Social Sciences	Economics	Peter A. Diamond	Massachusetts Institute of Technology	Approach to macro-economics policy through search equilibrium	Also won in 1965	
Social Sciences	Economics	Harold W. Kuhn	Princeton University	Formulation and calculation of economic equilibria		
Social Sciences	Economics	Robert B. Wilson	Stanford University	Strategic analysis of markets		
Social Sciences	Education	Christopher Jencks	Northwestern University	Economic equality and economic efficiency	Also won in 1967	
Social Sciences	Geography & Environmental Studies	Roger G. Barry	University of Colorado Boulder	Historical data on snow cover and sea ice conditions		
Social Sciences	Geography & Environmental Studies	Norton S. Ginsburg	University of Chicago	Issues posed by the law of the sea in East and Southeast Asia		
Social Sciences	Geography & Environmental Studies	John Fraser Hart	University of Minnesota	Use of rural land in the eastern United States		
Social Sciences	Law	Thomas M. Franck	UN Institute for Training and Research (visiting)	US concepts of self-interest in relation to the United Nations	Also won in 1973	
Social Sciences	Law	Charles M. Haar	Harvard University	Modern land-use planning system		
Social Sciences	Law	Douglas L. Leslie	University of Virginia	Application of economic theory to labor law		
Social Sciences	Law	Michael S. Wald	Stanford University School of Law	Standards for state intervention to protect abused children		
Social Sciences	Political Science	Benedict R. O'G. Anderson	Cornell University	State and society in the making of modern Indonesia		
Social Sciences	Political Science	Douglas E. Ashford	Cornell University	Political development of the European welfare state		
Social Sciences	Political Science	Jack Dennis	University of Wisconsin-Madison	Partisanship		
Social Sciences	Political Science	Morris P. Fiorina	California Institute of Technology	Politics in regulatory origin		
Social Sciences	Political Science	Michael Harrington	Queens College and Graduate Center CUNY	Political and social consequences of religious belief and disbelief		
Social Sciences	Political Science	Richard G. Niemi	University of Rochester	Application of a theory of fair political districting		
Social Sciences	Political Science	G. Bingham Powell Jr.	University of Rochester	Extremist political parties and democratic political performance		
Social Sciences	Political Science	William H. Riker	University of Rochester	Applied social choice theory and the controversy over constitutional revision, 1786-1788		
Social Sciences	Psychology	Elliott M. Blass	Johns Hopkins University	Olfactory conditioning in newborn human infants		
Social Sciences	Psychology	William E. Cooper	Harvard University	Psychological aspects of speech and typing		
Social Sciences	Psychology	Richard E. Snow	Stanford University	Theories of aptitude and achievement in education and work		
Social Sciences	Psychology	Harold W. Stevenson	University of Michigan	Child development research in Japan, China, and the US		
Social Sciences	Sociology	Barbara A. Anderson	Brown University	Language and ethnicity in the Soviet Union		
Social Sciences	Sociology	Glen H. Elder Jr.	Cornell University	Developmental and historical perspectives on the course of life		
Social Sciences	Sociology	Frank F. Furstenberg Jr.	University of Pennsylvania	Social and cultural consequences of divorce and remarriage		
Social Sciences	Sociology	Jan T. Gross	Yale University	Soviet rule in Poland, 1939-1941		
Social Sciences	Sociology	Ann Swidler	Stanford University	Love as a moral ideology in American culture		

== 1982 Latin American and Caribbean Fellows ==
Category	Field of Study	Fellow	Institutional association	Research topic	Notes	Ref
Creative Arts	Fiction	Márcio Souza		Writing		
Creative Arts	Fiction	Luisa Valenzuela		Writing		
Creative Arts	Fine Arts	Luis Camnitzer	SUNY at Old Westbury	Visual art	Also won in 1961	
Creative Arts	Fine Arts	Peter Minshall		Carnival design and kinetics		
Creative Arts	Music Composition	Gerardo Gandini	Universidad de La Plata and Universidad Católica Argentina	Composing		
Creative Arts	Music Composition	Max Lifchitz	Columbia University	Composing		
Creative Arts	Poetry	Heberto Juan Padilla		Writing		
Creative Arts	Video & Audio	Andrea Tonacci		A Visão dos Vencidos	Also won in 1978	
Humanities	Architecture, Planning, & Design	Paulo Ormindo David de Azevedo	Universidade Federal da Bahia	Brazilian "new towns"		
Humanities	Iberian & Latin American History	José Carlos Chiaramonte	Universidad Nacional Autónoma de México	State and society in the Argentine Littoral of the early 19th century		
Humanities	Latin American Literature	Angel A. Rama	University of Maryland	Research in Spain		
Humanities	Linguistics	Ivonne Aline Bordelois	Utrecht University			
Humanities	Music Research	Carmen García Muñoz	Universidad Católica Argentina			
Humanities	Spanish & Portuguese Literature	Luce López-Baralt	Universidad de Puerto Rico			
Natural Sciences	Mathematics	Djairo Guedes de Figueiredo	University of Brazil	Topological methods in the study of nonlinear partial differential equations	Also won in 1963	
Natural Sciences	Molecular & Cellular Biology	Hugo Aguirre Armelin	Harvard Medical School (visiting)	Biochemical studies of cell proliferation		
Natural Sciences	Molecular & Cellular Biology	Jesús Calderón	Instituto Politécnico Nacional			
Natural Sciences	Neuroscience	Jesús P. Machado-Salas	Universidad Nacional Autónoma de México			
Natural Sciences	Neuroscience	Fernando Orrego	Universidad de Chile	Spinal cord neurotransmitters		
Natural Sciences	Physics	Claudio Teitelboim	University of Texas Austin	Quantum theory of gravitation	Also won in 1991	
Natural Sciences	Physics	Constantino Tsallis	Centro Brasileiro de Pesquisas Físicas	Postdoctoral studies		
Natural Sciences	Physics	Arnulfo Zepeda Dominguez	International Centre for Theoretical Physics	Elementary particle physics		
Natural Sciences	Plant Sciences	João Murça Pires	Museu Goeldi	Taxonomic and ecological studies of South American plants		
Social Sciences	Anthropology & Cultural Studies	Franklin Pease	Pontificia Universidad Católica del Perú	Changes in Andean society from the 16th to the 18th centuries		
Social Sciences	Economics	José Luis Coraggio		Political economy		
Social Sciences	Political Science	Bolívar Lamounier		Contemporary theories of political democracy		

== See also ==
- Guggenheim Fellowship
- List of Guggenheim Fellowships awarded in 1981
- List of Guggenheim Fellowships awarded in 1983
