= Somma Lombardo =

- Comune
- Città di Somma Lombardo
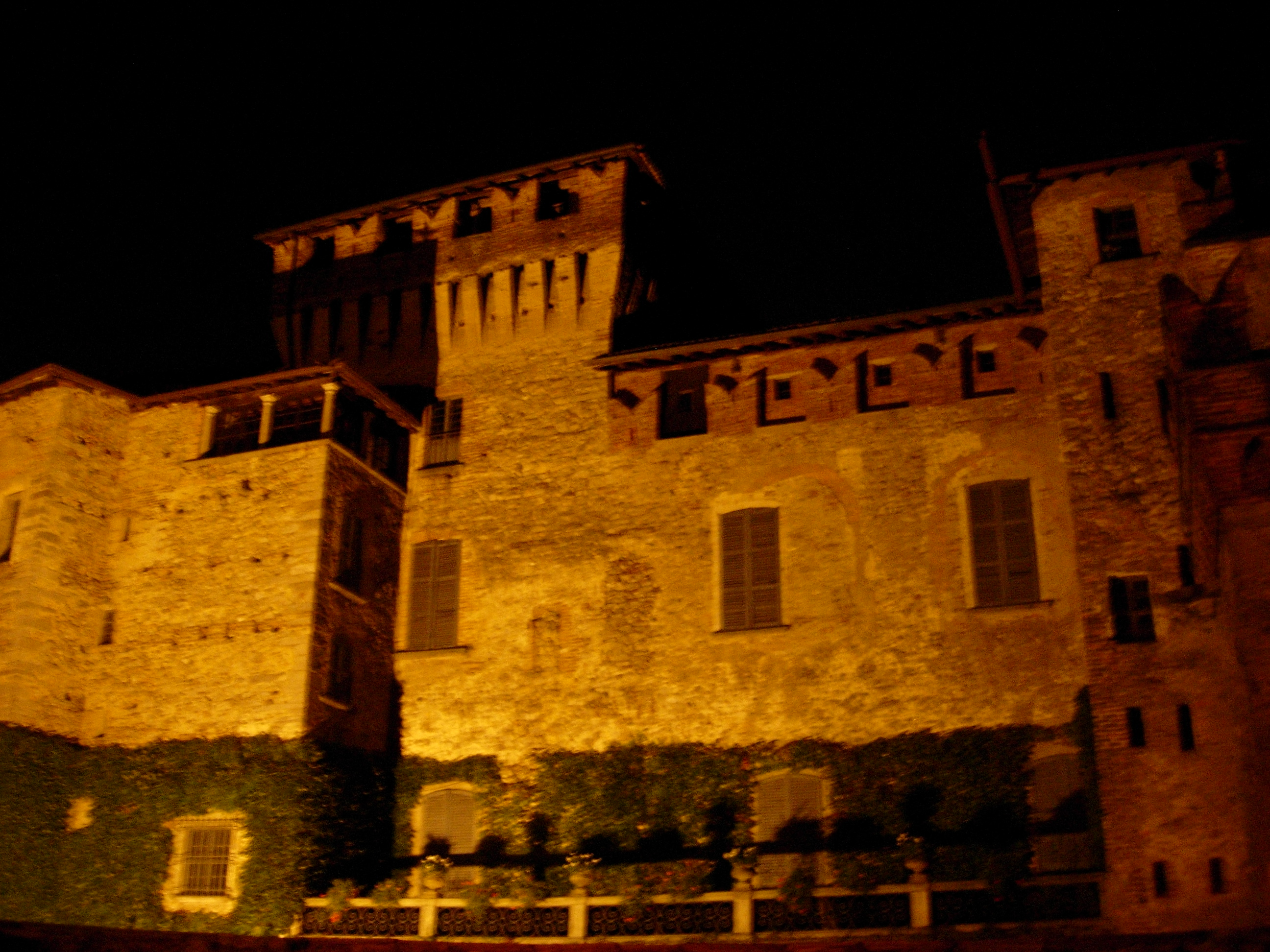

- Coat of arms

- Location within Italy Location within Lombardy
- Coordinates: 45°41′N 08°42′E
- Country: Italy
- Region: Lombardy
- Province: Varese (VA)
- Frazioni: Case Nuove, Coarezza, Maddalena, Mezzana

Government
  - Mayor: Stefano Bellaria

Area
  - Total: 30.51 km^{2} (11.78 sq mi)
- Elevation: 282 m (925 ft)

Population (28 February 2021)
  - Total: 17,482
  - Density: 573.0/km^{2} (1,484/sq mi)
- Demonym: Sommesi
- Time zone: UTC+1 (CET)
  - Summer (DST): UTC+2 (CEST)
- Postal code: 21019
- Dialing code: 0331
- Patron saint: Sant'Agnese
- Saint day: 21 January
- Website: Official website

Somma Lombardo (Suma in lombard) is a town in the province of Varese, Lombardy, Italy. It received the honorary title of city with a presidential decree on 16 June 1959.

== Industry ==
The airline Neos has its head office in the city.

== History ==
The town was strategically located on the consular Roman road, passing from the town of Sesto Calende and linking Milan to Verbano.

In medieval times, the city was under the jurisdiction of the nearby town of Arsago Seprio, an important political centre of the region.

In the forest around Somma, various vestiges of trenches and landing strips dating back to the Second World War can still be found.

== People ==
- Giuseppina Aliverti (1894–1982), geophysicist remembered for developing the Aliverti-Lovera method of measuring the radioactivity of water
- Niccolò Sfondrati, Pope Gregory XIV
- Valerio Valeri, anthropologist
