= Heinrich E. K. Henel =

Canadian-Australian professor of politics

- Born: 18 April 1905; Saigon, Vietnam
- Died: 7 March 1981 (aged 75); North Haven, Connecticut, USA
- Spouse: Ingebord (died 1998)
- Children: 2

Academic background
- Education: PhD., 1927, Goethe University Frankfurt
- Thesis: Die Entwicklung des geschichtlichen deutschen Prosastils bei Johannes von Müller

Academic work
- Discipline: German
- Sub-discipline: 17th-c German literature and poetry
- Institutions: University of Aberdeen; Cambridge University; Queen's University; University of Wisconsin-Madison; Yale University

Heinrich Edmund Karl Henel (18 April 1905 – 7 March 1981) was the Sterling Professor Emeritus of German at Yale University.

== Early life and education ==
Henel was born on 18 April 1905 in Saigon, Vietnam. He was born to German parents.

His daughter Bettina Charlotte Henel married Owen P. Stearns in 1954, a fellow academic.

== Career ==
Upon earning his PhD in 1927 from Goethe University Frankfurt, he began teaching at the University of Aberdeen in Scotland. He left the institute in 1929 and accepted a position at Cambridge University. He eventually emigrated to Canada where he served as Head of Queen's University German Department until 1947. He transferred to the United States after accepting a position at the University of Wisconsin-Madison. He was the recipient of a Guggenheim Fellowship in 1951 and awarded a John Simon Guggenheim Memorial Foundation fellowship grant in 1954. Henel joined the faculty at Yale University as a Full Professor in German in 1957.

He was the recipient of the 1962 Goethe Medal for "furthering cultural relations between the United States and Germany." In 1963, he was appointed to Sterling Professor of German at Yale.

In 1973, he was the recipient of the Order of Merit of the Federal Republic of Germany. He died from illness on 7 March 1981.

One of his PhD students was Thomas P. Saine.

== Selected publications ==
The following is a list of selected publications:

- Studien zum altenglischen computus (1934)
- Faust-Translations and Faust-Mosaics, a reply (1938)
- Type and proto-phenomenon in Goethe's science (1956)
- Die Entwicklung des geschichtlichen deutschen Prosastils bei Johannes von Müller (1965)
- Metaphor and meaning (1968)
- Lebendige Form; Interpretationen zur deutschen Literatur (1970)
- Goethezeit: ausgewählte Aufsätze (1980)
- The poetry of Conrad Ferdinand Meyer (1984)
