= Gabriel P. Weisberg =

American art historian (1942–2026)

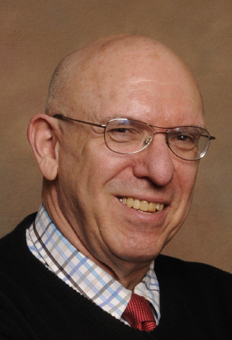
- Weisberg in 2011
- Born: Gabriel Paul Weisberg; May 4, 1942; New York City, U.S.
- Died: February 7, 2026 (aged 83)
- Occupations: Art historian; educator
- Spouse: Yvonne (m. 1967)

Academic background
- Education: New York University; Johns Hopkins University
- Thesis: The Early Years of Philippe Burty: Art Critic, Amateur, and Japoniste, 1855–1875 (1967)
- Influences: Henri Dorra

Academic work
- Discipline: Art history
- Sub-discipline: 19th–20th century French art
- Institutions: University of New Mexico; University of Cincinnati; University of Minnesota
- Notable students: Colleen Denney; Guy McElroy
- Website: www.gpweisberg.com

Gabriel Paul Weisberg OAL (May 4, 1942 – February 7, 2026) was an American art historian and educator. Weisberg was the Professor of Art History Emeritus at the University of Minnesota.

== Life and career ==
A native of New York City, Weisberg received a Bachelor of Arts from New York University in 1963. He then earned two degrees in Art History from Johns Hopkins University: a Master of Arts in 1966 and a Doctor of Philosophy in 1967. His doctoral dissertation was on the art critic Philippe Burty.

Shortly after graduating, Weisberg began his teaching career in art history at the University of New Mexico until 1969. Weisberg then moved on to the University of Cincinnati from 1969 to 1973. In 1982, he was awarded a Guggenheim Fellowship for research in art history. Three years later, Weisberg was hired as a professor of art history at the University of Minnesota, where he would spend the rest of his career. Upon retirement, he was given the title of Emeritus. During his career, Weisberg also had a stint as President of the Association of Historians of Nineteenth-Century Art.

In 1995, he was honored by the Government of France by being named Chevalier of the Ordre des Arts et des Lettres.

In 2008, a festschrift was produced in Weisberg's honor titled Twenty-First-Century Perspectives on Nineteenth-Century Art: Essays in Honor of Gabriel P. Weisberg. The publication included thirty essays from art historians, who were colleagues or students of Weisberg. At the end of that year, the Minneapolis Institute of Art exhibited nineteenth- and twentieth-century Realist drawings from the collection of Weisberg and his wife, Yvonne.

Throughout his career, Weisberg published extensively within the field of art history and studied artists in-depth such as François Bonvin, Léon Bonvin, and Félix Bracquemond, and topics such as Artistic Japan and Japonisme. He placed special focus on 19th and 20th century French art.

Weisberg died on February 7, 2026, at the age of 83.

== Select works ==
- The Paintings of François Bonvin in the Wadsworth Athenaeum, 1970
- Les Maîtres du XIX Siècle: Bonvin, 1979
- The Drawings and Watercolors of Léon Bonvin, 1980
- The Realist Tradition: French Painting and Drawing, 1830–1900, 1980
- Beyond Impressionism: The Naturalist Impulse, 1986
- The Independent Critic: Philippe Burty and the Visual Arts of Mid-Nineteenth Century France, 1993
- Art Nouveau: A Research Guide for Design Reform in France, Belgium, England, and the United States, 1998
- Overcoming All Obstacles: The Women of the Académie Julian, 1999

== See also ==
- List of Guggenheim Fellowships awarded in 1982
- List of Johns Hopkins University people
- List of members of the Ordre des Arts et des Lettres
- List of New York University people
- List of people from New York City
- List of University of Cincinnati people
- List of University of Minnesota people
