= Bouquet of Small Chrysanthemums (Léon Bonvin) =

Mid 19th century still life watercolour

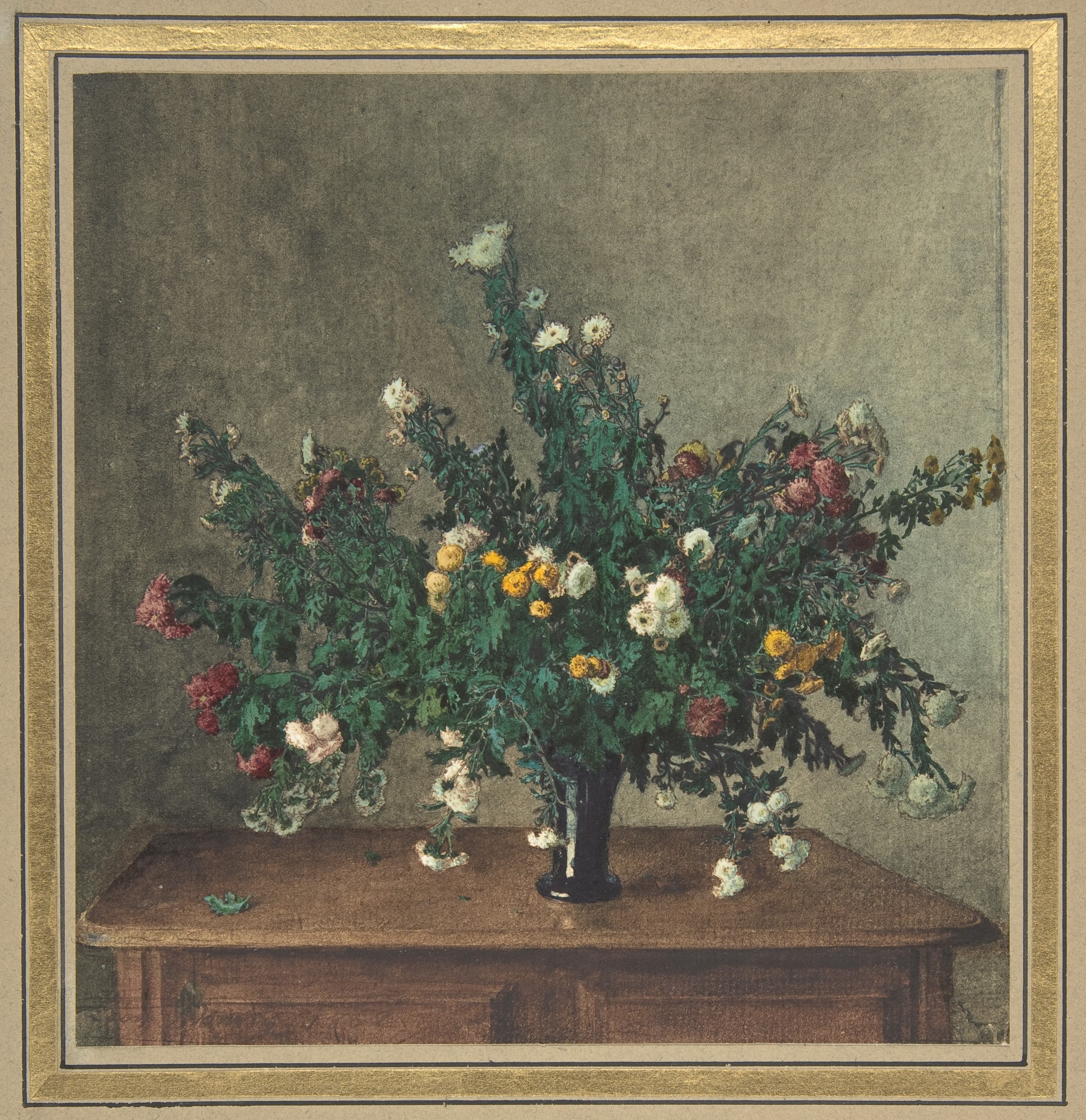
- Artist: Léon Bonvin
- Year: 1862
- Medium: Watercolor, gouache
- Dimensions: 15.5 cm × 14.9 cm (6.1 in × 5.9 in)
- Location: Metropolitan Museum of Art
- Accession: 1996.296

Bouquet of Small Chrysanthemums is a mid 19th century still life watercolor by Léon Bonvin. The drawing, which depicts a vase of flowers set on a table, is currently in the collection of the Metropolitan Museum of Art.

Poor and largely self-taught, Bonvin, born in Vaugirard near Paris, went largely unrecognized by the art world and hanged himself in 1866 at the age of 32.
