= Léon Bonvin =

French painter

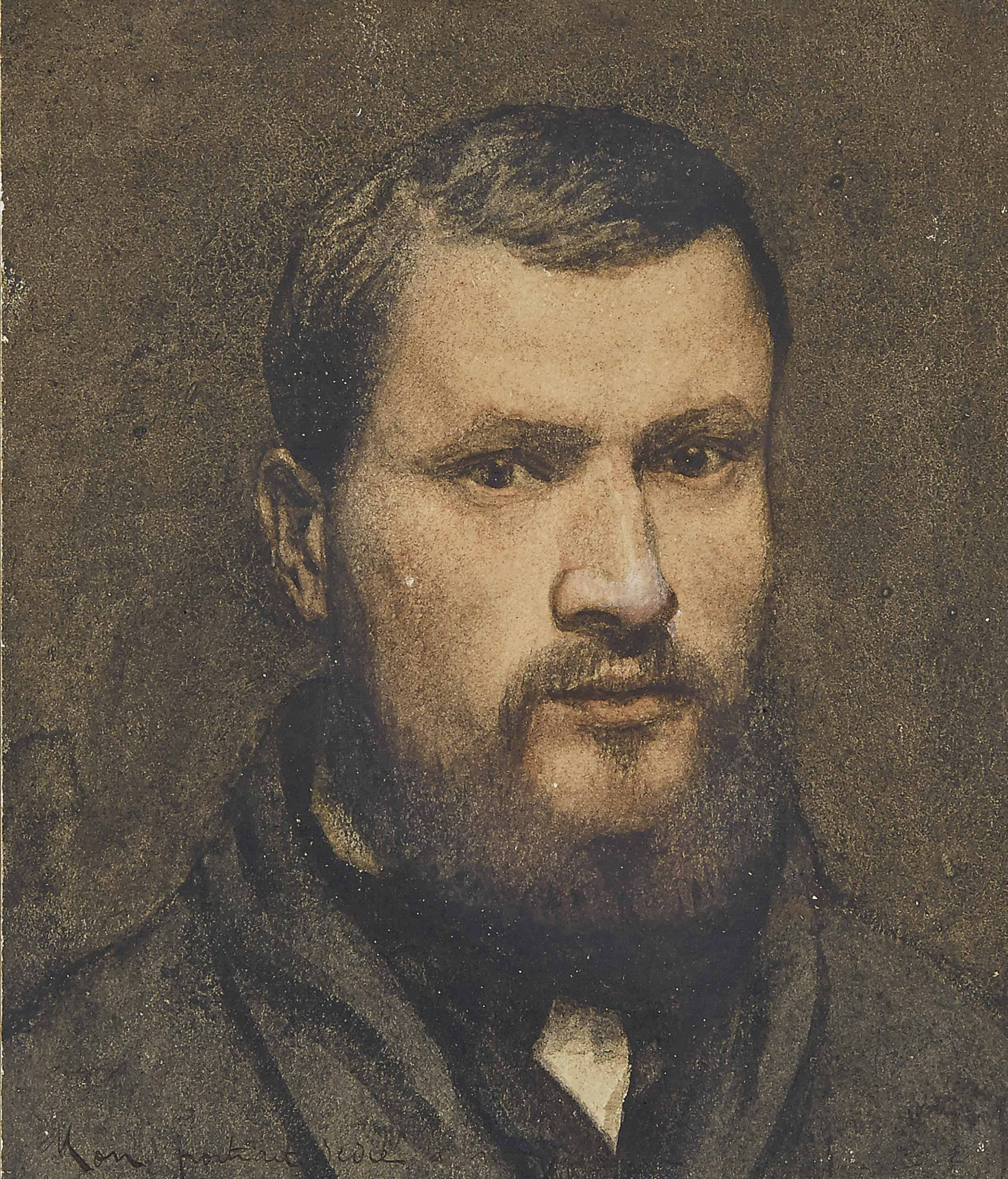
Léon Bonvin, a self-portrait inscribed to his wife and dated 19 January, 1866, shortly before his death by suicide.

Charles Léon Bonvin (February 28, 1834 – January 30, 1866) was a French watercolor artist known for genre painting, realist still life and delicate and melancholic landscapes.

== Biography ==
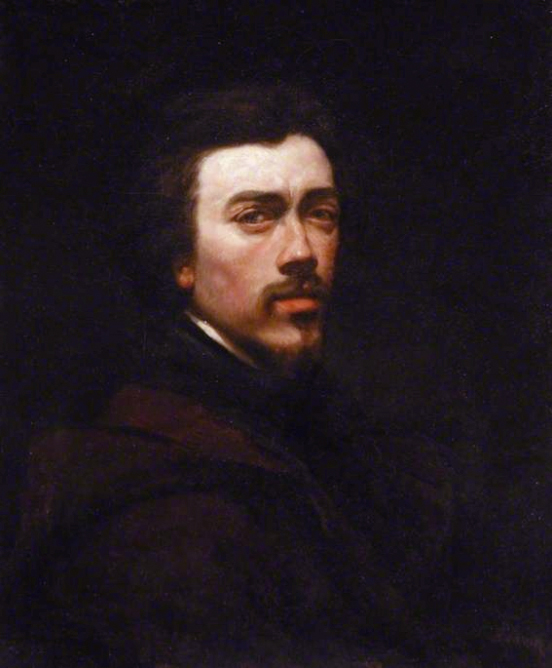
The artist's half-brother, François Bonvin, self-portrait, 1847

Bonvin was born in Vaugirard (at the time a municipality on the outskirts of Paris, today part of the city) in humble circumstances. He was the son of a constable and a seamstress who owned a poor guinguette. He had numerous siblings and lived in a barren plain; the household money was scarce.

As a young boy he began making small charcoal sketches, and gradually ink drawings. His older half-brother, the artist François Bonvin, encouraged him to continue and provided him with paints and the advice to carefully study the old masters of the Dutch Golden Age.

He probably attended some of the free classes offered by l'École royale gratuite de dessin created by Bachelier but was mostly self-taught. He also learned to play music on a harmonium.

In 1861 Bonvin married, soon had children, and worked as an innkeeper. The young couple struggled; the inn lost money; anguish set in. Yet painting in the stillness of early morning, at dusk or at night, Bonvin was able to create numerous genre paintings echoing the manner of Jean Siméon Chardin, meticulous still life studied with the precision of a botanist and subtle landscapes capturing fleeting atmospheric effects and solitude. These were mostly fragile watercolors for affordability reasons, oil paints being more expensive.

He approached gallerists on rue Laffitte and rue du Bac, but he made few sales of his watercolors. In January 1866, Bonvin traveled to Paris again to offer his watercolors to a dealer, who rejected them as too dark. Desperate, he hanged himself the next day in the forest, on January 30, 1866, and was discovered a few days later; he was 31 years of age.

== Posterity ==
At the initiative of his half-brother François, because of the dire circumstances in which his family was left, a special art sale of his works was organized to raise money, with artists donating their own works as well; these included Claude Monet, Henri Fantin-Latour, and Johan Barthold Jongkind, among many others "who must have been aware of the quality of Léon's art or knew his brother François Bonvin". The special sale took place at the Hôtel Drouot in Paris on May 24, 1866.

Art historian Gabriel P. Weisberg, in Léon Bonvin's Realism Revisited, wrote:

What has been advanced here is that others recognized the significance of both artists at the time, although it was François who generated more discussion since he lived longer, completed oil paintings, and was a regular exhibitor at the Paris Salon. Léon Bonvin's watercolors capture a sense of the ineffable with a delicacy that belies the destitute circumstances of his daily life. Seeing just a few of his watercolors is spellbinding and haunting.

Among the collectors interested in Bonvin’s work, William T. Walters, father of Henry Walters, founder of the Walters Art Museum, who acquired some of Bonvin’s fragile works. His collection eventually comprised 56 watercolors and a single rare oil. The works were donated to the city of Baltimore by Henry Walters; today, it is the largest collection of Bonvin's work in existence.

From 15 February–13 August 2023, the Walters Art Museum exhibited Quiet Beauty: The Watercolors of Léon Bonvin, a display of 16 of his watercolors. The Walters also lent works to the Fondation Custodia in Paris for the 2022-2023 exhibit that resulted in the first catalogue raisonné of Bonvin’s work, Drawn to the Everyday, Léon Bonvin (1834–1866) (ISBN 978-2-958-32340-0).

== Collections ==
- Walters Art Museum
- Metropolitan Museum of Art
- J. Paul Getty Museum
- Morgan Library & Museum
- Museum of Fine Arts, Houston
- Louvre
- Musée du Luxembourg
- British Museum

== Gallery ==
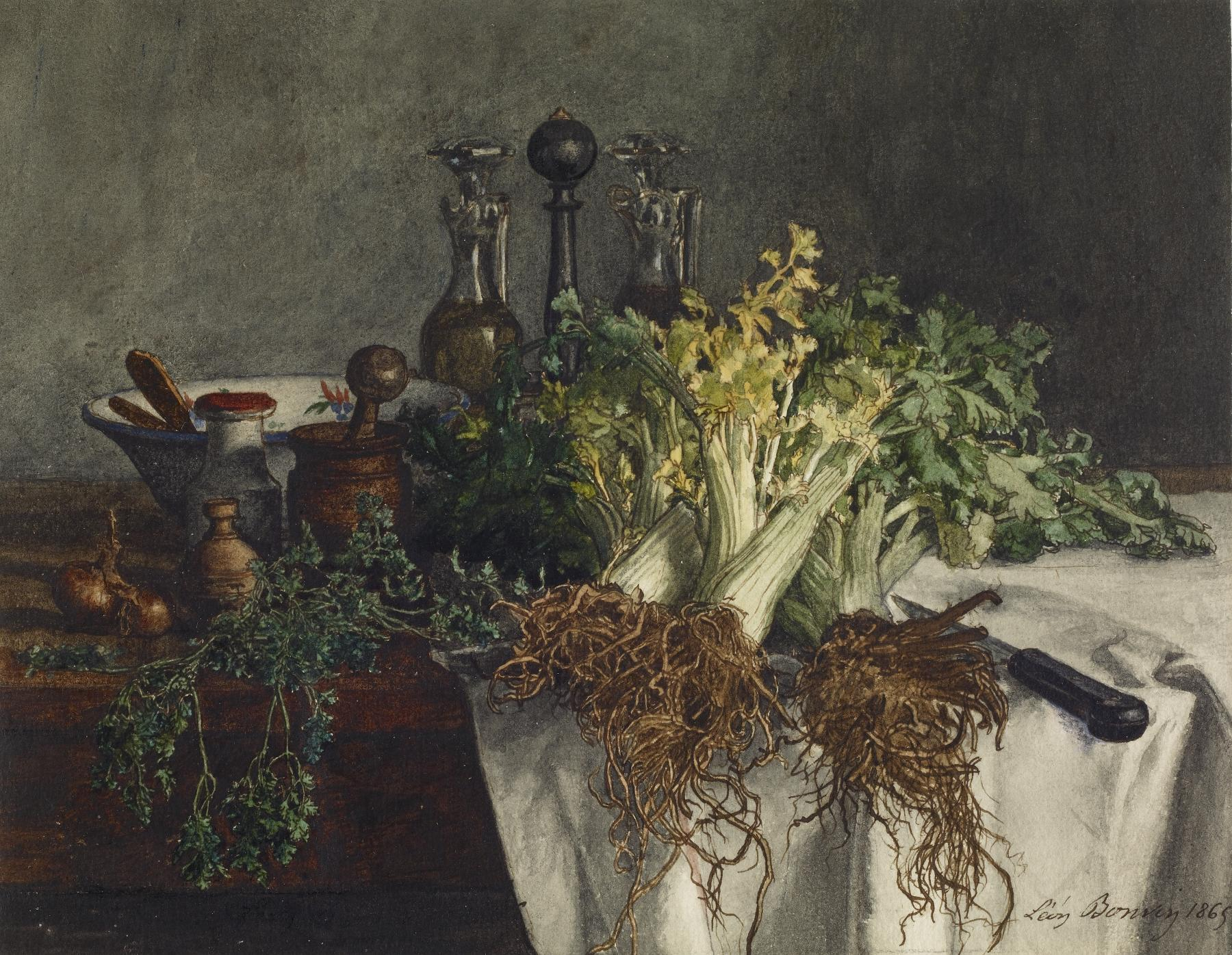
Still Life on Kitchen Table with Celery, Parsley, Bowl, and Cruets, 1865, Walters Art Museum

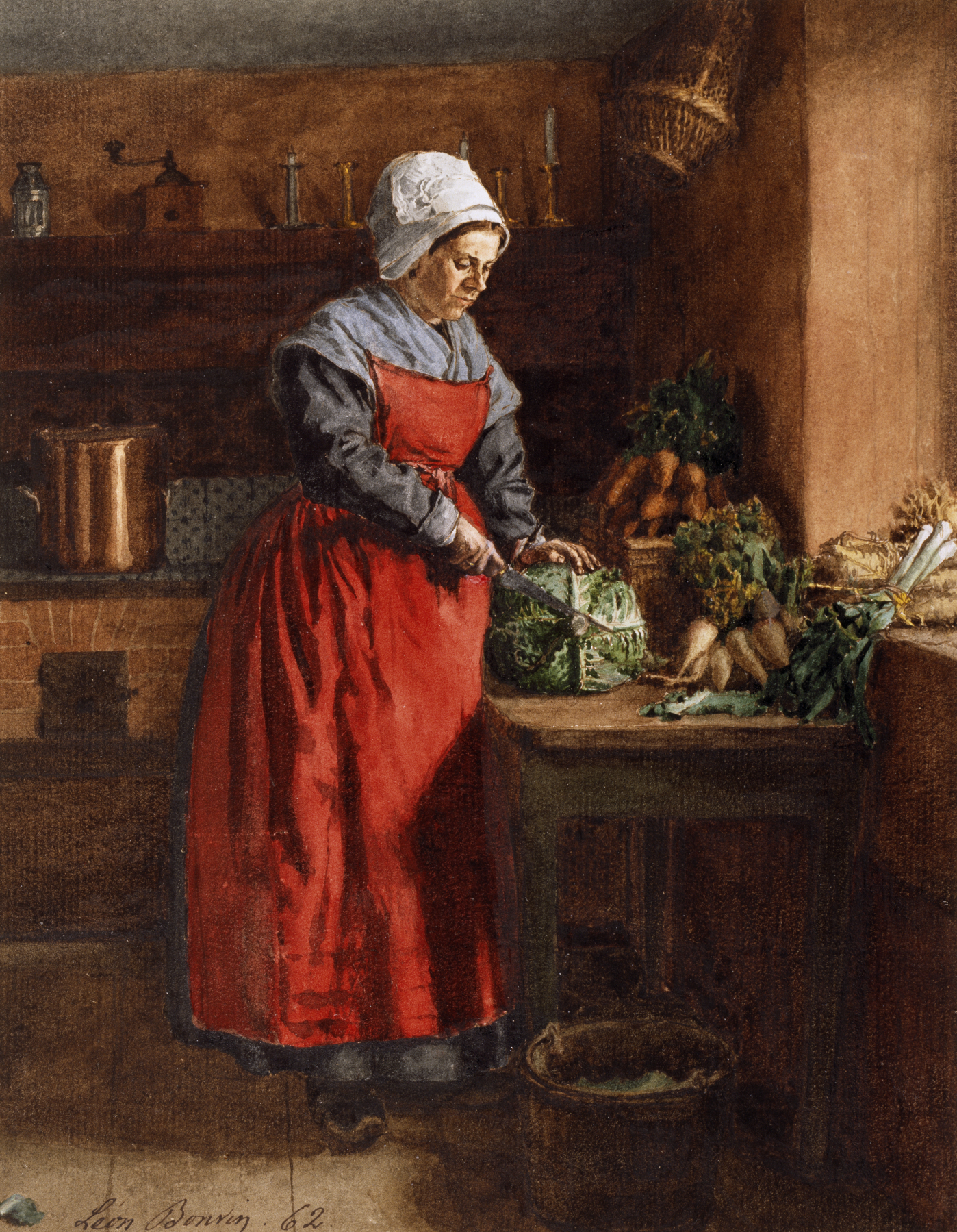
Léon Bonvin - Cook with Red Apron

Léon Bonvin - Basket of Grapes, Walnuts, and Knife

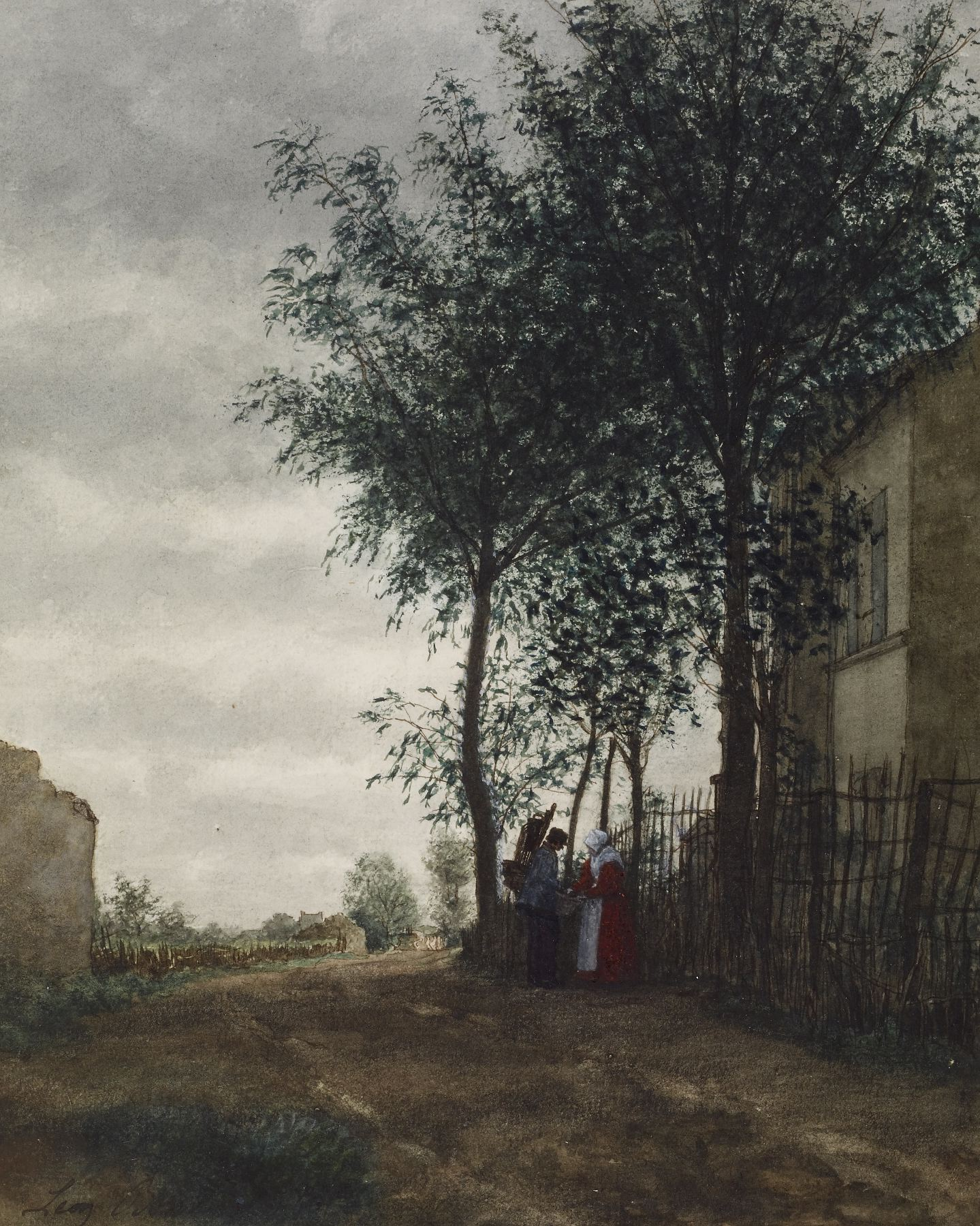
Léon Bonvin - The Country Inn

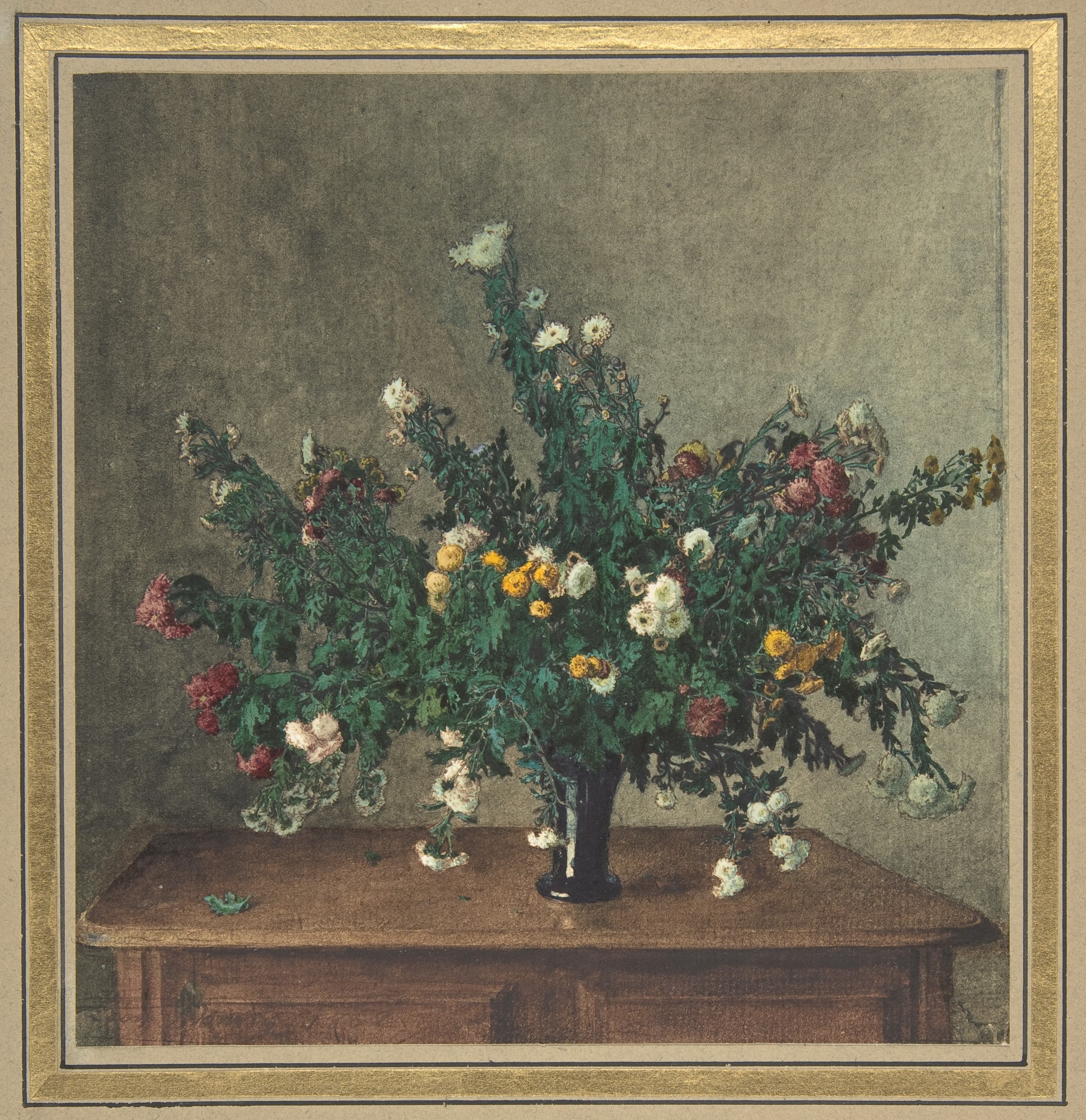
Léon Bonvin - Bouquet of Small Chrysanthemums - Metropolitan Museum of Art 1996.296

== Bibliography ==
- Gabriel P. Weisberg, William R. Johnston : The Drawings and Water Colors of Leon Bonvin, Cleveland Museum of Art, 1981, ISBN 9780910386623.
- Drawn to the Everyday, Léon Bonvin (1834–1866), catalog for the Fondation Custodia exhibition in Paris, 2022-2023 (ISBN 978-2-958-32340-0).
