= Giuseppina Aliverti =

Italian geophysicist

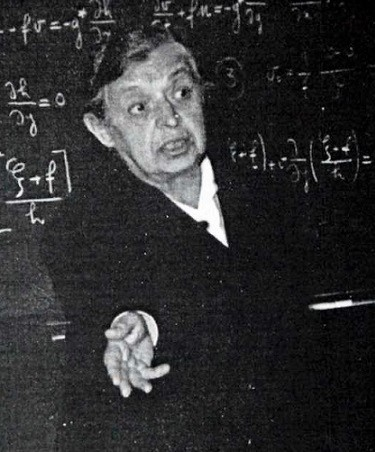
- Professor Aliverti
- Born: 4 December 1894; Somma Lombardo, Kingdom of Italy
- Died: 10 June 1982 (aged 87); Naples, Italy
- Education: University of Turin
- Occupation: geophysicist
- Known for: Aliverti-Lovera method of measuring the radioactivity of water

Giuseppina Aliverti (4 December 1894 – 10 June 1982) was an Italian geophysicist specializing in several fields of terrestrial physics. She is remembered for developing the Aliverti-Lovera method of measuring the radioactivity of water.

== Biography ==
Born in Somma Lombardo (Varese), Italy on 4 December 1894, Giuseppina had at least one sister, Teresa Aliverti with whom she remained very close. Giuseppina Aliverti graduated with honours in physics in 1919 from the University of Turin.

From 1932 to 1935, she was the professor in charge of geodesy and geophysics in Turin, and then from 1936 to 1951 she taught terrestrial physics as well.

In 1937, the Italian Ministry of Agriculture and Forestry announced that Aliverti had the top scores in a geophysics competition and as the winner, she became the director of the Geophysical Observatory of Pavia, Italy while, at the same time, she taught terrestrial physics at the University of Pavia.

Aliverti moved to Naples in 1949 to continue her teaching career at the Naval University Institute there (now called the Parthenope University) where she was chair of meteorology and oceanography. There, she became dean of the faculty of nautical sciences from 1960 until 1970, when she retired.

Aliverti died in Naples on 10 June 1982.

=== Research summary ===
Aliverti's official research began in 1920 with studies on the concentrations of electrolytic deposits. Expanding on her work on terrestrial physics, she started a line of experiments on electricity and the natural radioactivity of the atmosphere. In 1937, her work earned her the ten-year prize awarded by the Italian Society for the Progress of Sciences for Geophysical Studies.

Working with physicist Giuseppe Lovera (1912–1990), and using a procedure that she developed with him (known as the Aliverti-Lovera method), she enabled researchers to calculate the radioactivity of water. According to Linguerri, her radioactivity research was significant.

Thanks to the development of a quantitative method to measure the radioactivity of the air based on the properties of the electric effluvium, she was able to determine the contribution that radioactivity gives to the ionization of the air. In particular, she found that the atmospheric air near the continental soil always contains radon as well as the products of its disintegration and sometimes even thorium. Conversely, she detected the scarce presence of radioactivity in the sea air.

Later, collaborating again with Lovera, Aliverti made notable advances in marine aerosol research. Because she was a member of a subcommittee for oceanography of Italy's National Research Council (CNR), she developed the itinerary for five scientific cruises in the Tyrrhenian Sea that were carried out between 1958 and 1960. The data collected on those trips allowed researchers to calculate the average annual evaporation of this sea and was the starting point for future surveys of the Strait of Gibraltar (1961) and the Tyrrhenian Sea (1963).

=== Other academic interests ===
Even as she pursued her primary passion of physical oceanography, Aliverti continued until her last years to study atmospheric electricity and glaciology, in collaboration with researchers at the University of Turin at Col d'Olen in the Aosta Valley. Then she studied the mountains from a mathematical perspective working with the mathematical physicist Carlo Somigliana. She was particularly interested in the Lys glacier on Monte Rosa.

=== The Aliverti-Lovera cosmic ray tool ===
According to the Archiepiscopal seminary of Milan, it maintained its own terrestrial physics observatory, which included the Aliverti-Lovera cosmic ray tool for measuring cosmic radiation.

The Observatory's activities covered meteorology, seismology, atmospheric electricity, radioactivity and cosmic radiation. After some time in fact, the Observatory was equipped with an instrument signed ALIVERTI-LOVERA and built by the well-known technicians and instrument makers MASERA and VASCHETTI of Turin. It consisted of a Wulf electrometer and four ionization chambers with a high voltage power supply. This was the first of the tools adopted to investigate radioactivity and cosmic rays; it should be remembered that in those years the ionization chambers connected to electrometers were the best and most modern tools for making this type of measurement.

== Memberships ==
- Member of the Pontaniana Academy of Naples (1958)
- Corresponding member of the National Academy of the Lincei (1964)
- Corresponding member of the Lombard Institute's Academy of Sciences and Letters of Milan (1969).

== Selected honours ==
- Gold Medal of Merit of School, Culture and Art (1963)
- Grand Officer of Merit of the Italian Republic (1971)
- Gold Medal of the Faculty of Nautical Sciences of the Naval University of Naples (1971)

== Selected works ==
Aliverti authored numerous academic papers; the following have been cited by other authors most frequently.

- Aliverti, Giuseppina, and M. C. Montù. "Su inversioni del campo elettrico terrestre a cielo sereno e una loro possibile spiegazione." Il Nuovo Cimento (1924-1942) 8.1 (1931): 15-21.
- Aliverti, Giuseppina, and Giuseppe Lovera. I fenomeni meteorologici sull'Oceano e il campo elettrico terrestre. R. Accademia Delle Scienze, 1939.
- Aliverti, Giuseppina. "La condensazione del vapor d'acqua nell'atmosfera." Ricercu sci. 12, 1251 1260 (1941).
- Aliverti, Giuseppina. "La salinità delle precipitazioni a Pavia nel periodo ottobre 1944-ottobre 1945." Ricerca sci. e ricostruz 16 (1946): 929-931.
- Aliverti, Giuseppina, Arturo De Maio, and Mario Picotti. Sulla evaporazione annua dal Tirreno meridionale. Istituto Sperimentale Talassografico Trieste, 1959.
- AAliverti, Giuseppina. Glaciologia. Consiglio Naz. delle Ricerche, 1964.
- Consiglio nazionale delle ricerche. Commissione per la oceanografia e la limnologia, et al. Atlante del Mar Tirreno: Isoterme ed isoaline dedotte dalle misure eseguite durante le crociere per l'anno geofisico internazionale 1957-1958. Consiglio nazionale delle ricerche, 1968.
- Aliverti, Giuseppina, and Arturo De Maio. "SOPRA UN "SURGE" DI ACQUA ACCADUTO SUL GHIACCIAIO DEL LYS (Mone Rosa)." (1973).
