= Gerald Levinson =

American classical composer

Gerald Charles Levinson (born June 22, 1951 in Westport, Connecticut) is an American composer of contemporary classical music.

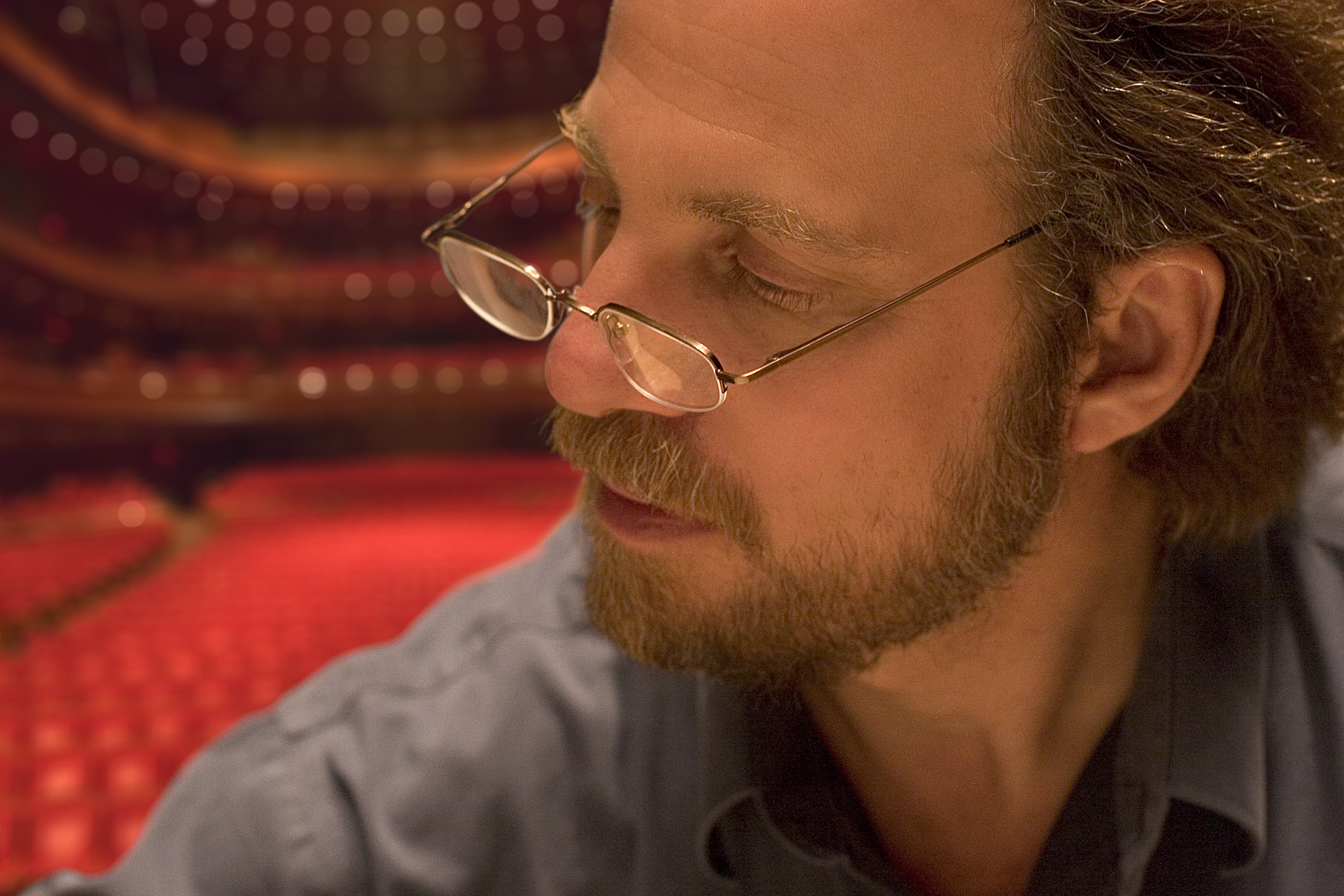
Gerald Levinson in Marian Anderson Hall in the Kimmel Center in a portrait taken by Ari Valen Levinson.

== Life ==
At university, he studied with George Crumb, Richard Wernick, and George Rochberg. He received his doctorate in 1977 from the University of Chicago. After college, Levinson went to study composition with Olivier Messiaen at the Paris Conservatory. He was inspired by Messiaen's use of birdsong and his unique harmonic ideas, as well as the musics of Bali and India. Levinson has also worked with Simon Rattle, Ralph Shapey, and Seiji Ozawa.

His notable works include Anahata, Symphony No. 2, and Black Magic/White Magic (1981), a collaboration with his wife, poet Nanine Valen. Numerous CDs of his music have been released, and his scores are published by Theodore Presser.

He has taught music at Swarthmore College since 1977. His works have previously been performed by orchestras such as the Philadelphia Orchestra and the Los Angeles Philharmonic. A new work for organ and orchestra by Levinson was premiered by the Philadelphia Orchestra in its 2005–2006 season. He has two children, Adam Valen Levinson, and Ari Valen Levinson.

== Awards ==
- Guggenheim Fellowship (1982)
- Music Award of the American Academy of Arts and Letters (1990)
- The Goddard Lieberson Fellowship of the American Academy of Arts and Letters
- N.E.A. Fellowship, twice
- 2007 Pew Fellowships in the Arts
