= François Bonvin =

French painter (1817–1887)

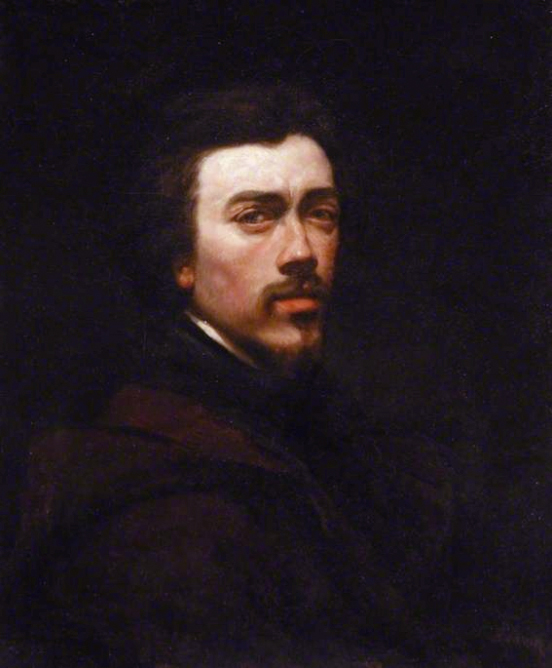
Self portrait (1847)

François Bonvin (November 22, 1817 – December 19, 1887) was a French realist painter.

== Early life ==
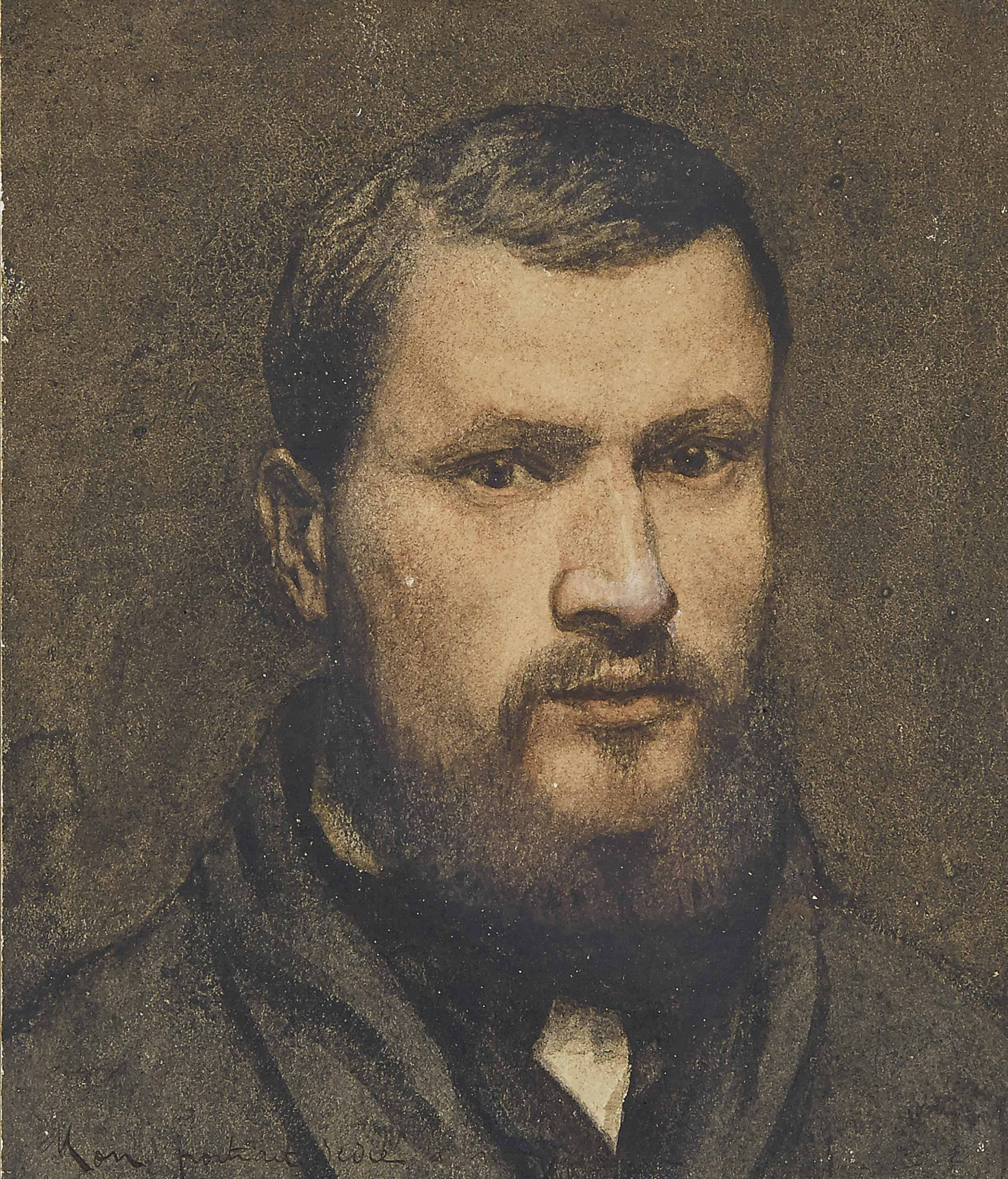
The artist's half-brother Léon Bonvin in a self-portrait made shortly before his suicide in 1866

Bonvin was born in humble circumstances in Paris, the son of a police officer and a seamstress. When he was four years old his mother died of tuberculosis and young François was left in the care of an old woman who underfed him. Soon his father married another seamstress and brought the child back into the household. Nine additional children were born, including Léon Bonvin, who also became an artist. The family's resources were severely strained, and to make matters worse his stepmother took to abusing and undernourishing François.

Bonvin started drawing at an early age. His potential was recognized by a friend of the family, who paid for him to attend a school for drawing instruction at age eleven. Bonvin attended the Ècole de Dessin in Paris from 1828 until 1830, when his father apprenticed him to a printer. Bonvin later studied at the Académie Suisse, but was mostly self-taught as an artist. He considered François Granet, to whom he showed some of his drawings in 1843, his only mentor. Bonvin spent his free time at the Louvre where he especially appreciated the Dutch old masters and was welcomed by the collector Louis La Caze.

== Career ==
Still Life with Violin, Sheet Music, and a Rose, 1870, Legion of Honor, San Francisco

Bonvin married a laundress at the age of twenty, at about the same time that he secured a job at the headquarters of the Paris police, where he worked until 1850. It was during this period that he contracted an illness which would trouble him for the rest of his life.

Bonvin exhibited three paintings in the Salon of 1849, where he was awarded a third-class medal. He exhibited in the Salon of 1850 with Courbet, and won recognition as a leading realist, painting truthfully the lives of the poor which he knew at first hand. His paintings were well received by critics and by the public. Although his work had elements in common with Courbet's, his modestly scaled paintings were not seen as revolutionary. He was awarded the Légion d'honneur in 1870.

His subjects were still life and the everyday activities of common people, painted in a style that is reminiscent of Pieter de Hooch and Jean-Baptiste-Siméon Chardin. It is the latter who is especially recalled by Bonvin's delicate luminosity.

In 1881 he underwent an operation which did not restore him to health, and he became blind. A retrospective exhibition of his work was held in 1886. He died at Saint-Germain-en-Laye in 1887.

In 1978 Editions Geoffroy-Dechaume published Les Maîtres du XIX Siecle: Bonvin, Professor Gabriel Weisberg's critical analysis on the life and work of the artist.

== Gallery ==
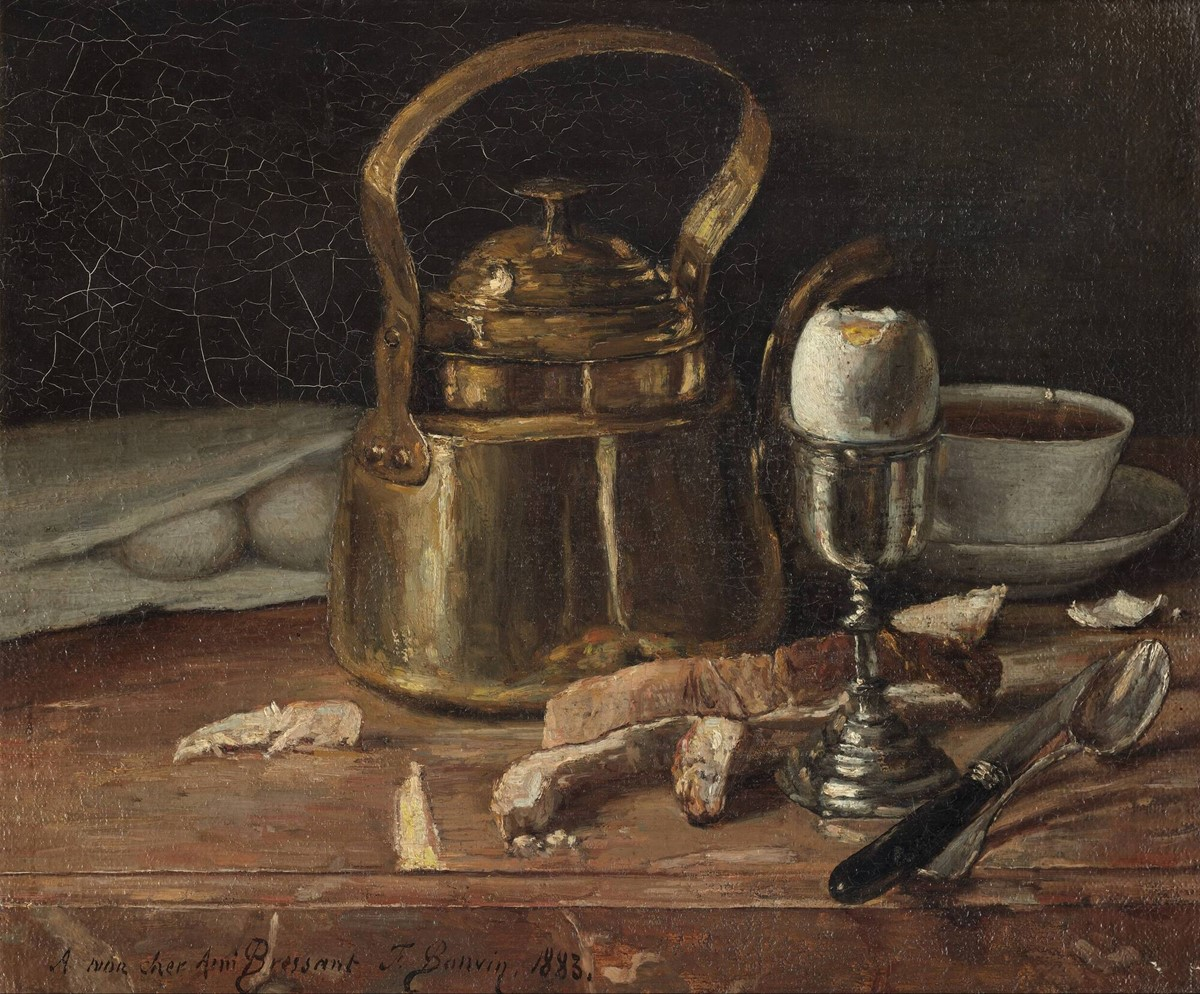
Still Life, 1883, Museum Boijmans Van Beuningen

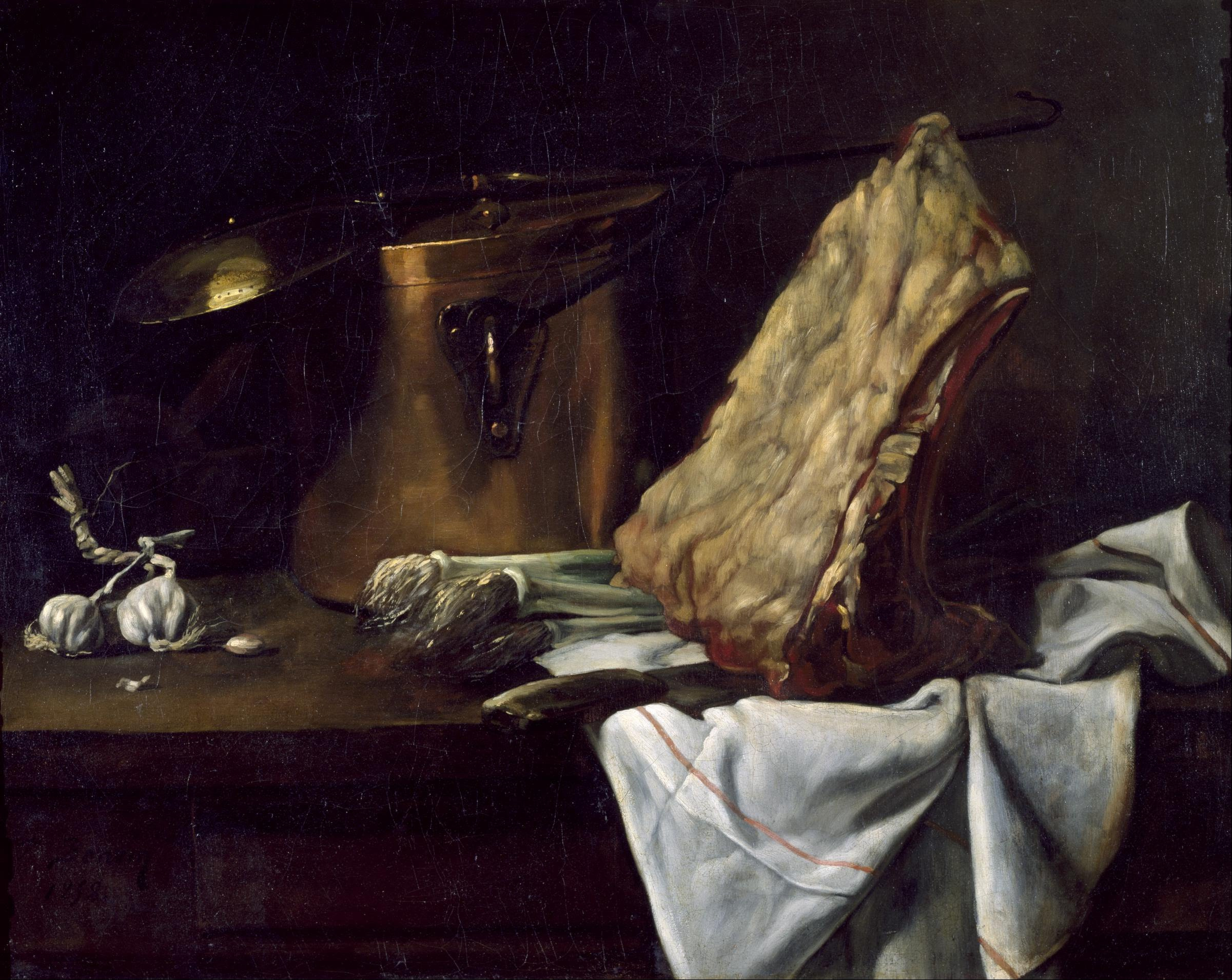
Still Life, 1858

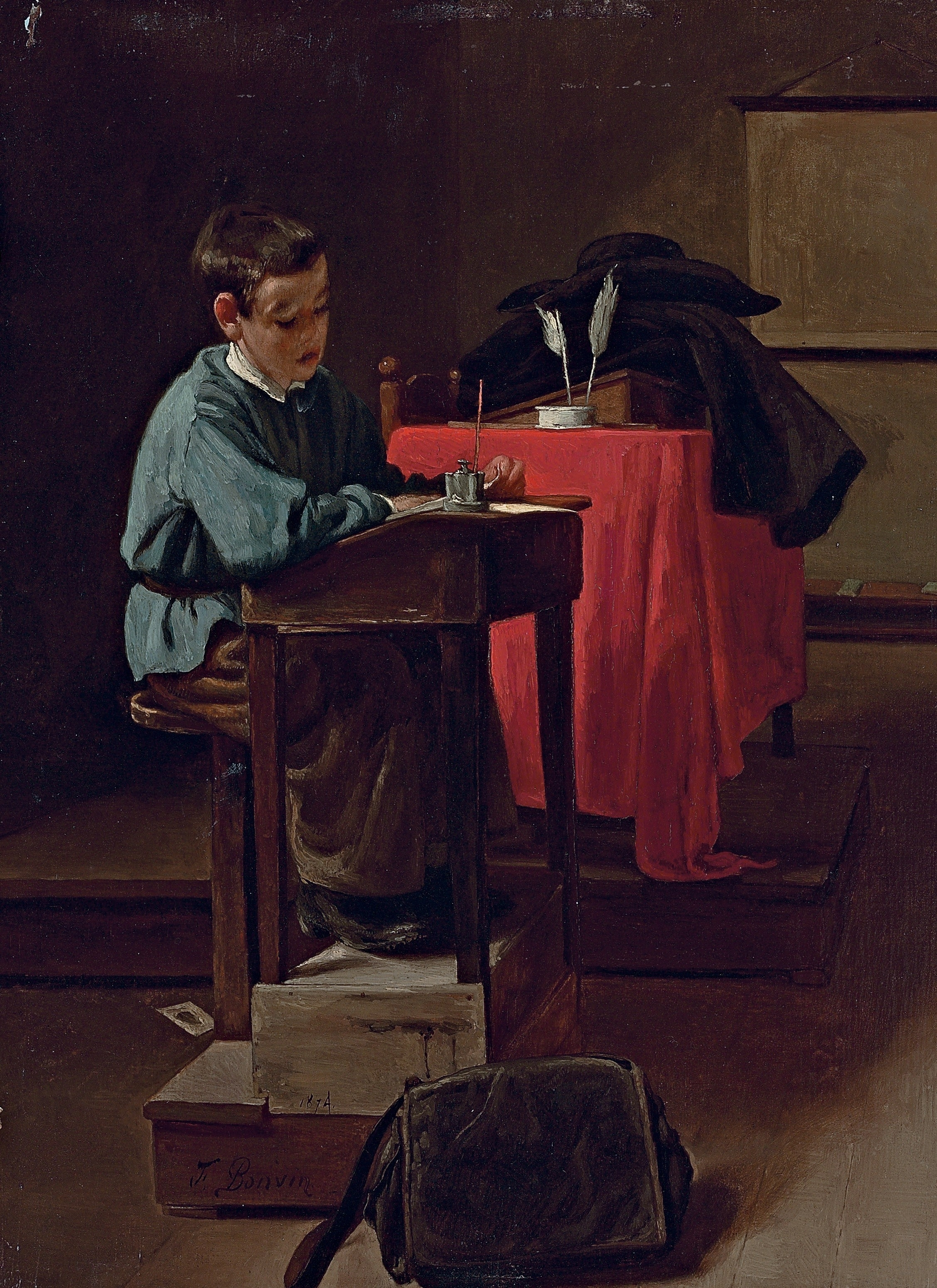
L'écolier, 1874

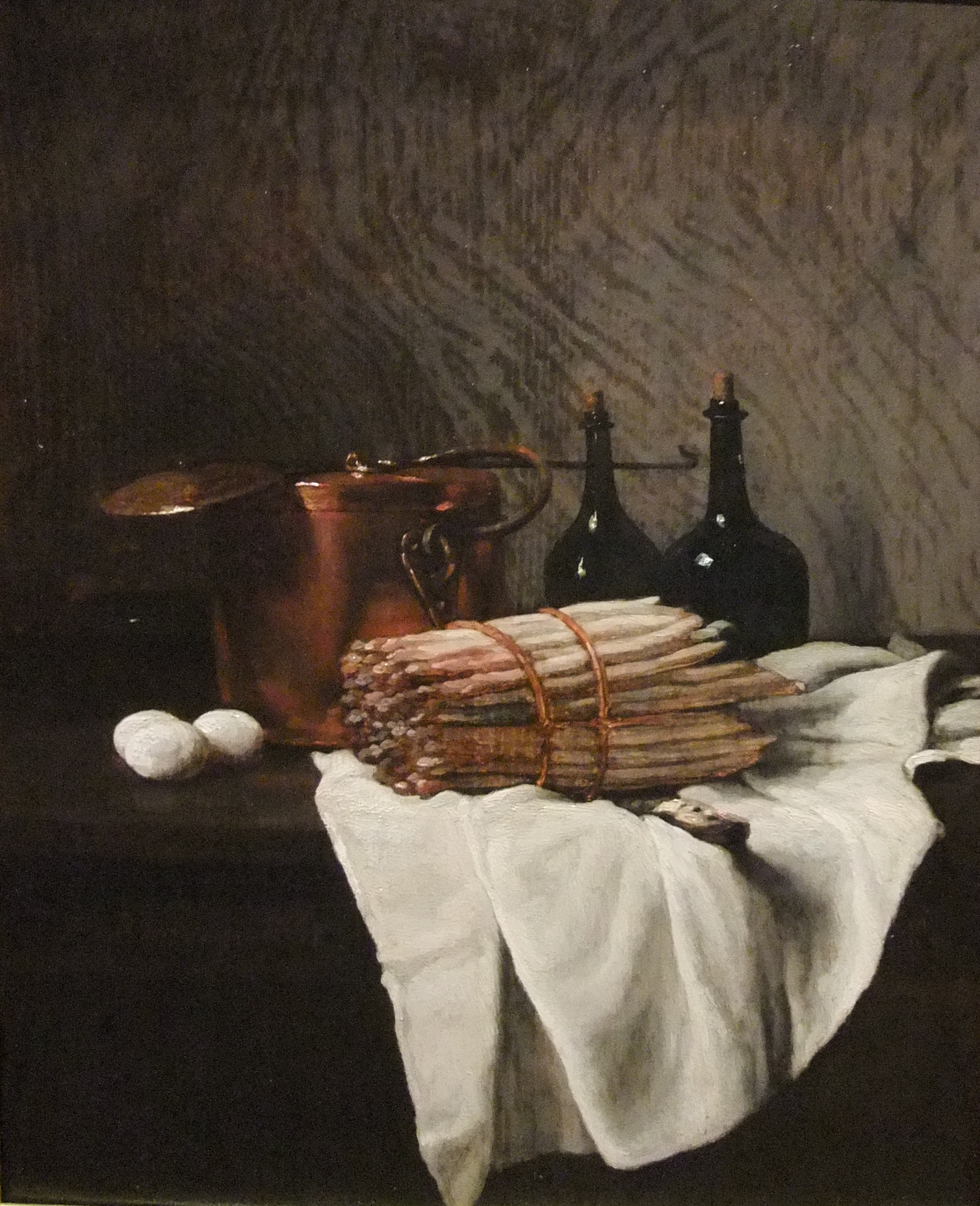
Still Life with Asparagus, 1862

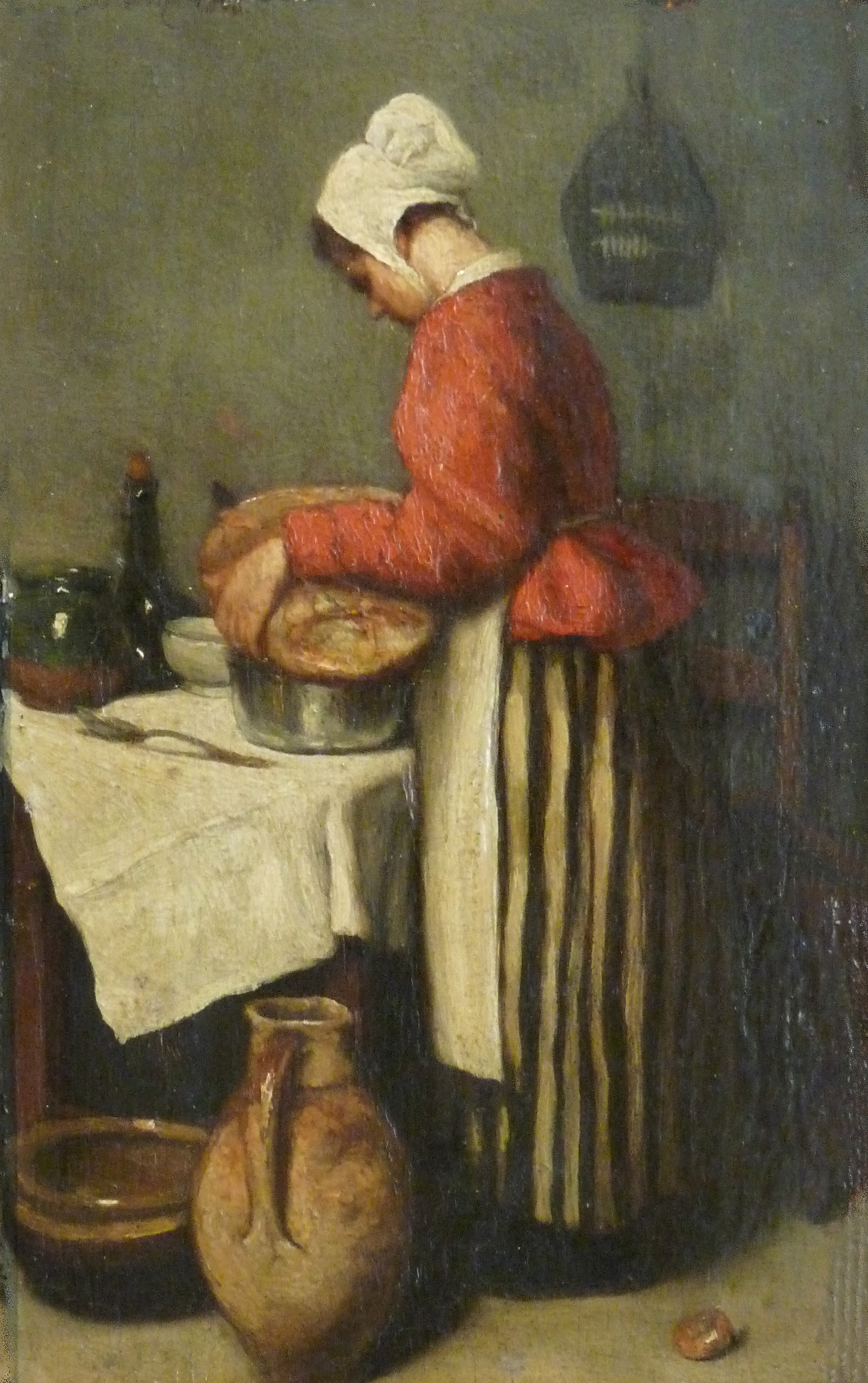
La tailleuse de soupe, c. 1886, Musée des beaux-arts de Mulhouse

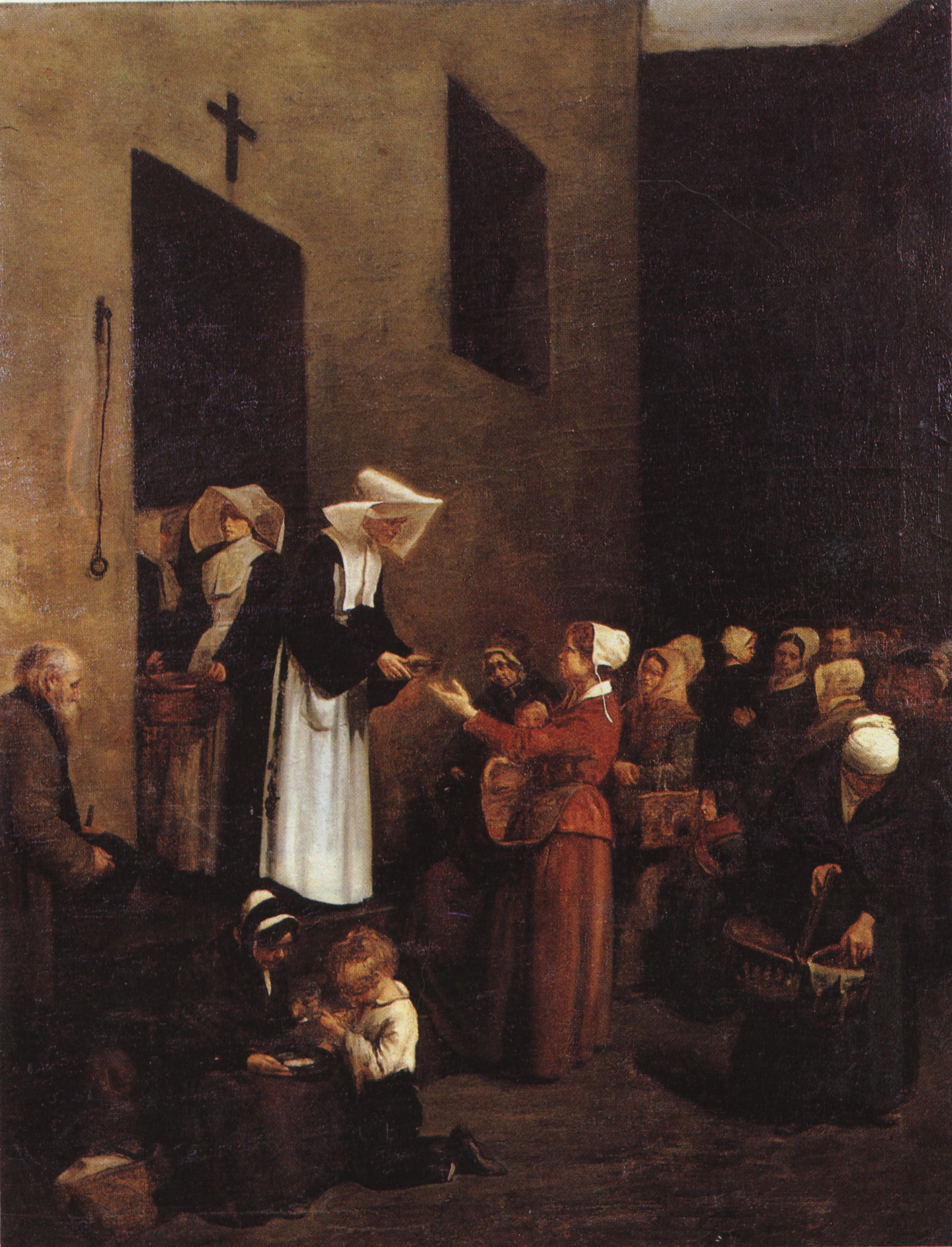
Charity, 1851

== Bibliography ==
- Gabriel P. Weisberg : The Paintings of François Bonvin in the Wadsworth Atheneum, Wadsworth Atheneum, 1970.
