= Thomas P. Saine =

American professor of German studies

Thomas Price Saine (March 8, 1941 – December 5, 2013), usually called Tom Saine, was an American professor of German studies who taught at University of California, Irvine, from 1975 to 2005.

== Life and academic career ==
Saine was born in 1941 in Brooklyn, New York, the son of Clarence Price Saine and Evelyn Meadows Saine. After attending Christian Brothers High School in Memphis, he studied at Yale University from 1958 to 1962, when he graduated with a B.A. in German. After studying at the University of Tübingen and Rice University, he returned to Yale where he obtained his Ph.D. in 1968 under the supervision of Heinrich E. K. Henel and taught as a German instructor, assistant and associate professor from 1969 to 1975. In 1975, he moved to UC Irvine as associate professor and was promoted to full professor and department chair in 1976. He was one of the original members of the Goethe Society of North America in 1979 and the founding editor of its Goethe Yearbook, which published its first issue in 1982 and the Goethe Society's Vice President 2001–2002. Saine was awarded a Guggenheim Fellowship in 1982. He retired from UC Irvine as emeritus professor in 2005. In 2010, he moved to Texas and lived in Plano, until his death from complications of lung cancer in Dallas on December 5, 2013. Saine was divorced and had two sons.

== Research themes and interests ==
Saine's main interest was in Goethezeit, the period between 1770 and 1830 in German literature, and he was a well-known scholar of Goethe and the culture of 18th-century Germany. In his time at Yale, he studied mostly Enlightenment authors, especially radical theologians and freethinkers. His thesis considered the aesthetics of Karl Philipp Moritz (1756–1793). In 1972, he published the first English biography of Georg Forster. At Irvine, his research interests included authors such as Christian Wolff, Johann Gottfried Seume and Adolph von Knigge. He investigated the German Enlightenment and its reaction to the French Revolution in his books The Problem of Being Modern and Black Bread-White Bread.

One of the central topics of Saine's research was Johann Wolfgang von Goethe, and he wrote several essays on Goethe, founded the Goethe Society of North America, edited the Goethe Yearbook that played a central role in American Goethe scholarship, and translated and edited some of Goethe's works. Saine was described as a Goethe fan, and not only owned a large Goethe-related library, but also used Goethe-related vanity plates for his vehicles. His California car registration was GOETHE 1, his California motorcycle registration was GOETHE; when Saine moved to Texas, he was able to obtain another GOETHE plate for his car. His GOETHE 1 California plate later appeared in a novel, Der gestohlene Abend by German author Wolfram Fleischhauer, based on the author's experiences as an international student at Irvine. One of Tom Saine's original GOETHE 1 license plates has been displayed by Fleischhauer at readings.

== Publications ==
Besides more than forty research articles, Saine wrote the following five books:

- Saine, Thomas P. (1971). Die ästhetische Theodizee: Karl Philipp Moritz und die Philosophie des 18. Jahrhunderts (in German). W. Fink.
- Saine, Thomas P. (1972). Georg Forster. New York, Twayne Publishers.
- Saine, Thomas P. (1987). Von der kopernikanischen bis zur Französischen Revolution : die Auseinandersetzung der deutschen Frühaufklärung mit der neuen Zeit. Berlin: E. Schmidt. ISBN 3503022163. OCLC 20526562.
- Saine, Thomas P. (1988). Black Bread–white Bread: German Intellectuals and the French Revolution. Camden House. ISBN 9780938100577.
- Saine, Thomas P.; Saine, Thomas Price (1997). The Problem of Being Modern, Or, The German Pursuit of Enlightenment from Leibniz to the French Revolution. Wayne State University Press. ISBN 9780814326817.

Saine also edited some volumes (those with Goethe's autobiographical writings) of Goethe's collected works in English, including his own translations of Campaign in France and Siege of Mainz:

- Goethe, Johann Wolfgang von; Heitner, Robert R; Saine, Thomas P; Sammons, Jeffrey L (1994). From my life: poetry and truth. Princeton, N.J.; Chichester: Princeton University Press. ISBN 9780691037981. OCLC 278329572.
- Goethe, Johann Wolfgang von; Heitner, Robert R; Saine, Thomas P; Sammons, Jeffrey L (1994). From my life: poetry and truth. Pt. 4. Princeton, N.J.; Chichester: Princeton University Press. ISBN 9780691037981. OCLC 316138295.
