= Pat Ferrero =

American filmmaker

- Born: March 22, 1942 (age 84); Santa Fe, New Mexico, U.S.
- Occupations: Filmmaker; curator
- Awards: Guggenheim Fellow (1982)

Academic background
- Education: University of Michigan (BS); San Francisco State University (MA)

Academic work
- Institutions: San Francisco State University

Pat Ferrero (born March 22, 1942) is an American filmmaker and curator. A 1982 Guggenheim Fellow, she created, directed, and produced several documentaries such as Quilts in Women's Lives (1980), Hopi: Songs of the Fourth (1983), Hearts and Hands (1987). She was a professor at San Francisco State University, as well as a curator of quilt exhibitions.

== Biography ==
Pat Ferrero was born on March 22, 1942, in Santa Fe, New Mexico. In addition to two years at Syracuse University, as well as one at Accademia di Belle Arti di Firenze, she obtained her BS from the University of Michigan in 1964, as well as an MA from San Francisco State University in 1972 (followed by six years of postgraduate studies).

After working two years as director of education at the International Child Art Center in San Francisco, she was an art instructor at the San Francisco Museum of Modern Art (1969-1970), UC Berkeley Extension (1969-1974), and San Francisco Art Institute (1971). In 1974, she returned to SFSU as associate professor of creative arts, eventually being promoted to professor emerita.

After doing some paintings, she started experimenting with filmmaking in the 1960s. Her work initially included Roots of Child Art (1972) and Possum Trot: The Life and Work of Calvin Black (1976). She directed the 1980 film Quilts in Women's Lives, which involved interviewing sixty women before culling down to only seven in the final version. it won a 1980 Gold Cindy Award for Documentary and a 1981 American Film Festival Emily Award. In 1982, she was awarded a Guggenheim Fellowship in filmmaking. She created the 1983 documentary Hopi: Songs of the Fourth World, focusing on maize in Hopi society. In 1987, she released the film Hearts and Hands, which explores the role of quilting in 19th-century women; it aired on PBS' American Experience in 1988.

She also worked as a curator, with her work including the San Francisco Art Institute's Quilts in Women's Lives (1976) and the Oakland Museum of California's American Quilts: A Handmade Legacy (1981). She also co-authored a companion book for Hearts and Hands alongside Elaine Ryan Hedges and Jane Silber. She worked as a moderator for the Mendocino Film Festival in 2018.

== Filmography ==
- Roots of Child Art (1972, as co-producer)
- Possum Trot: The Life and Work of Calvin Black (1976)
- Quilts in Women's Lives (1980, as director)
- Hopi: Songs of the Fourth World (1983, as director-producer)
- Hearts and Hands (1987, as creator)
