= William A. Christian =

American religious historian and independent scholar

- Born: William Armistead Christian Jr. 1944 (age 81–82)
- Awards: MacArthur Fellowship (1986)

Scholarly background
- Education: Harvard University; University of Michigan

Scholarly work
- Discipline: History
- Sub-discipline: Religious history
- Main interests: History of Catholicism in Spain

William Armistead Christian Jr. (born 1944) is an American religious historian and independent scholar. He was the J.E. and Lillian Byrne Tipton Distinguished Visiting Professor in Religious Studies at University of California, Santa Barbara. Christian is a graduate of Harvard and received his PhD from the University of Michigan (PhD 1971).

== Awards ==
- 1986 MacArthur Fellows Program

== Works ==
- Moving crucifixes in modern Spain, Princeton University Press, 1992
- Visionaries: The Spanish Republic and the Reign of Christ, University of California Press, 1996, ISBN 978-0-520-20040-1
- Local religion in sixteenth-century Spain, reprint, Princeton University Press, 1989, ISBN 978-0-691-00827-1
- Apparitions in late Medieval and Renaissance Spain, Princeton University Press, 1981, ISBN 978-0-691-05326-4 (reprint, Princeton University Press, 1989, ISBN 978-0-691-00826-4)
- Person and God in a Spanish Valley, Seminar Press, 1972, ISBN 978-0-12-785119-8 (reprint Princeton University Press, 1989, ISBN 978-0-691-02845-3)
- Divided island: faction and unity on Saint Pierre, Harvard University Press, 1969
- Religiosidad local en la España de Felipe II, Translators Javier Calzada, José Luis Gil Aristu, Editorial NEREA, 1991, ISBN 978-84-86763-59-6
- La Fiesta en el mundo hispánico, Editors Palma Martínez-Burgos García, Alfredo Rodríguez González, Univ de Castilla La Mancha, 2004, ISBN 978-84-8427-293-9
- Divine Presence in Spain and Western Europe 1500-1960, The Natalie Zemon Davis Annual Lectures, Central European University Press, 2012, ISBN 978-615-5053-37-5
- The Stranger, the Tears, the Photograph, the Touch; Divine Presence in Spain and Europe since 1500, Central European University Press, 2017, ISBN 978-615-5225-29-1
