= Carmen García Muñoz =

Argentine musicologist

- Born: 3 March 1929; Buenos Aires, Argentina
- Died: 12 August 1998 (aged 69)
- Occupation: Musicologist
- Awards: Guggenheim Fellowship (1982)

Academic background
- Education: Conservatorio Nacional Superior de Música; Pontifical Catholic University of Argentina

Academic work
- Discipline: Musicology
- Sub-discipline: Argentine music; Latin American colonial music
- Institutions: Pontifical Catholic University of Argentina; Institute of Musicological Research

Carmen García Muñoz (3 March 1929 – 12 August 1998) was an Argentine musicologist who specialized in the music of both her native country and colonial Latin America.

== Biography ==
She was born on 3 March 1929 in Buenos Aires. She began studying at the Conservatorio Nacional Superior de Música as a piano professor from 1949 and as a composition professor from 1952. Her doctoral dissertation was on Juan de Araujo, with one of the supervisors being Roberto Caamaño. From 1955 to 1970, she was part of the CNM's faculty.

In 1966, she later obtained her licentiate in music at the Pontifical Catholic University of Argentina, where in 1970 she then began teaching as a professor of music and left the Conservatorio Nacional Superior de Música. At UCA, she eventually became full professor of musicology and history of Argentine music. In 1980, she became the director of the Institute of Musicological Research, a position she held until 1998. For her research, she visited archives within Bolivia and Peru.

She specialized in Argentine music and Latin American colonial music, with Azucena Adelina Fraboschi saying that her work in the former field made her "dedication [...] passionate and tireless". Among musicians she wrote on included Julián Aguirre, Caamaño, Juan José Castro, Pedro Valenti Costa, Luis Gianneo, Floro Ugarte, and Carlos Vega. In 1972, she released the book Un archivo musical americano. In 1982, she was awarded a Guggenheim Fellowship "for an edition of the complete works of Juan de Araujo". She participated in the Bibliografía musicológica latinoamericana as Argentina's representative. She also did magazine articles, work cataloguing, and supplements for music releases.

In 1997, a Juan Pedro Esnaola composition she transcribed premiered during mass at the St. Ignatius Church, Buenos Aires, during which she was a commentator. At a March 1998 dinner, UCA rector Guillermo Blanco called her the "great-granddaughter of Esnaola".

She died on 12 August 1998, after a few days of illness.
