= Lily Litvak =

Mexican literary scholar (born 1938)

- Born: 5 June 1938 (age 88); Mexico
- Occupation: Literary scholar
- Spouse: Rafael Pérez de la Dehesa (div. 1971)
- Children: 1
- Awards: Guggenheim Fellowship (1982)

Academic background
- Education: National Autonomous University of Mexico (BS); Tufts University (MA); University of California, Berkeley (PhD)

Academic work
- Sub-discipline: Ibero-American fin de siècle
- Institutions: University of Texas at Austin

Lily Litvak de Kravzov (born 5 June 1938) is a Mexican academic who has written several books on Spanish literature, particularly the fin de siècle era. A professor emeritus at the University of Texas at Austin, she is a 1982 Guggenheim Fellowship and a 2012 corresponding member of the Real Academia de Córdoba.

== Biography ==
Lily Litvak was born on 5 June 1938 in Mexico, and came from Mexico City. She obtained a BS from the National Autonomous University of Mexico in 1961 she moved to the United States, where she obtained an MA from Tufts University in 1965 and a PhD from the University of California, Berkeley in 1972.

In 1972, Litvak became an assistant professor of Spanish and Portuguese at University of Texas at Austin, before being promoted to associate professor in 1977. She eventually retired from UT Austin as professor emerita.

Litvak specializes in the Ibero-American fin de siècle era; she told the Austin American-Statesman in 1982 that she chose this period because it was "very relevant, very similar to today: it was complex, filled with philosophical paradoxes." She has written several books and edited volumes, including A Dream of Arcadia: Anti-Industrialism in Spanish Literature, 1895-1905 (1975), Transformación industrial y literatura en España (1895-1905) (1980), El sendero del tigre: Exotismo en la literatura española de finales del siglo XIX, 1880-1913 (1986), El tiempo de los trenes: El paisaje español en el arte y la literatura del realismo (1848–1918) (1991), and Imágenes y textos: Estudios sobre literatura y pintura 1849-1936 (1998). (Note: Reviews of this book:) (Note: Reviews of this book:) She has also served as a curator of a few painting exhibitions in Spain.

In 1982, Litvak was awarded a Guggenheim Fellowship "for a study of exoticism in Spanish art and literature, 1888–1910"; Litvak said that she would travel to France and Spain for her work with the Fellowship. She was appointed corresponding member of the Real Academia de Córdoba on 3 May 2012.

Litvak was married to Rafael Pérez de la Dehesa, a Spanish historian who worked as a professor at University of California, Berkeley, until their 1971 divorce; they had one son.

== Works ==
- (ed.) El Nacimiento del Niño Dios (1973)
- A Dream of Arcadia: Anti-Industrialism in Spanish Literature, 1895-1905 (1975) (Note: Reviews of this book:)
- Erotismo fin de siglo (1979)
- Transformación industrial y literatura en España (1895-1905) (1980)
- Musa libertaria: Arte, literatura y vida cultural del anarquismo español (1981)
- El cuento anarquista (1982)
- El jardín de Aláh: temas del exotismo musulmán en España (1985)
- El sendero del tigre: Exotismo en la literatura española de finales del siglo XIX, 1880-1913 (1986)
- Viaje al interior de Persia: el itinerario de Rivadeneyra, 1874-75 (1987)
- La mirada roja: estética y arte del anarquismo español (1988)
- España 1900: modernismo, anarquismo y fin de siglo (1990)
- El tiempo de los trenes: El paisaje español en el arte y la literatura del realismo (1848–1918) (1991) (Note: Reviews of this book:)
- Antología de la novela corta erótica española de entreguerras (1918-1936) (1993)
- Imágenes y textos: Estudios sobre literatura y pintura 1849-1936 (1998) (Note: Reviews of this book:)
- La voz del mar (2000)
- Geografías mágicas: viajeros españoles del siglo XIX por países exóticos (2013)
- (ed. with Médar Serrata) Metropolis: Espacio Urbano. Modernidad y conflicto en la literature de España y Latinoamerica (2015)
