= Valerio Valeri (anthropologist) =

Italian anthropologist

Valerio Valeri (August 4, 1944 – April 24, 1998) was an Italian anthropologist best known for his work in the ethnology of Polynesia and Indonesia. He is well known for his monographs “Kingship and Sacrifice: Ritual and Society in Ancient Hawaii”, and “The Forest of Taboos: Morality, Hunting, and Identity among the Huaulu of the Moluccas”.

Valeri taught at the University of Chicago from 1976 until his death. He was awarded a Guggenheim Fellowship in 1982.

== Education ==
Valeri received his undergraduate degree from the Scuola Normale Superiore di Pisa, later receiving a doctorate from both Pisa and the Sorbonne.

== Bibliography ==
- Kingship and Sacrifice: Ritual and Society in Ancient Hawaii, The University of Chicago Press, Chicago, IL, 1985.
- Uno spazio tra sé e sé. L'antropologia come ricerca del soggetto, a cura di M. Feldman e J. Hoskins; traduzione italiana a cura di B. Lazzaro, Donzelli Editore, Roma, 1999.
- The Forest of Taboos: Morality, Hunting, and Identity among the Huaulu of the Moluccas, The University of Wisconsin Press, Madison, WI, 2000.
- Fragments from Forests and Libraries: A Collection of Essays, Carolina Academic Press, Durham, NC, 2001.
- Ritual and Annals: Between Anthropology and History, edited by R. Stasch, S.M. Dowdy and G. da Col, HAU Books/The University of Chicago Press, Chicago, IL, 2014.
- Classical Concepts in Anthropology, edited by G. da Col and R. Stasch, HAU Books/The University of Chicago Press, Chicago, IL, 2018.
