= Anna Blackburne =

English naturalist and collector (1726–1793)

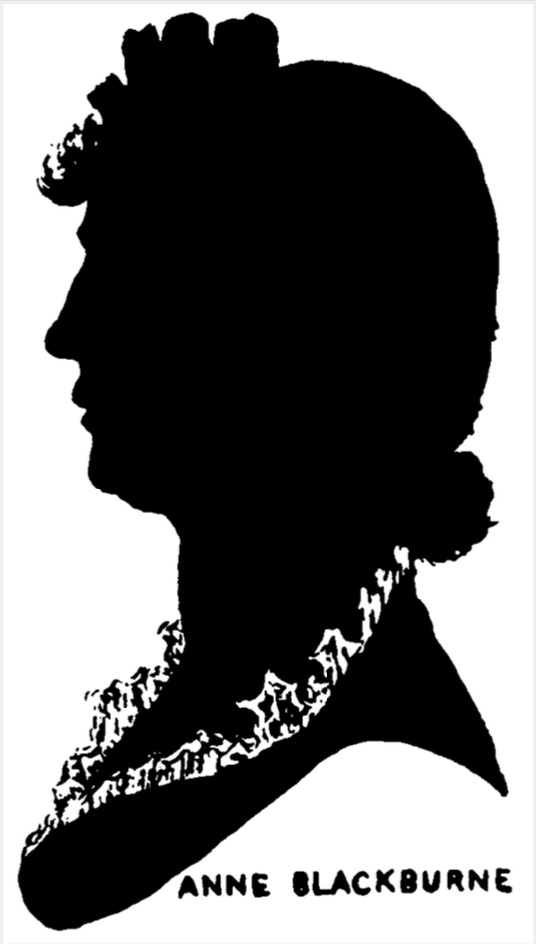
- Silhouette profile portrait of Blackburne, published 1854
- Born: Anne Blackburne; Orford Hall, Warrington, England
- Baptised: 3 January 1726
- Died: 30 December 1793 (aged 67)
- Parents: John Blackburne (father); Katharine Ashton or Assheton (mother)

Signature
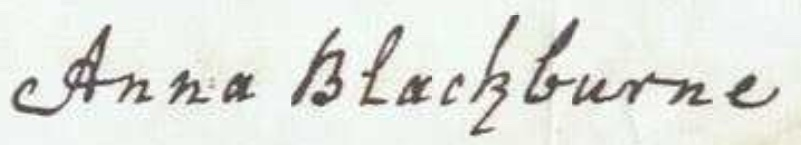

Anna Blackburne (baptised Anne Blackburne; bapt. 3 January 1726 – 30 December 1793) was an English botanist, naturalist, and collector who assembled an extensive collection of natural history specimens and corresponded with several notable naturalists of her era. Blackburne was born at Orford Hall, Orford, Warrington, Lancashire, into a family of landowners and merchants. After her mother's death, she lived at Orford with her father John Blackburne, who was known for his interest in botany and his hothouses for exotic plants. John Blackburne also had an extensive library where Anne probably studied botany; she later taught herself Latin so she could read the Systema Naturae of Carl Linnaeus. She developed a natural history museum where she collected insects, shells, minerals and birds. She regularly met with the naturalist Johann Reinhold Forster while he was teaching at Warrington Academy. Forster instructed her in entomology and helped with her insect collection.

Blackburne corresponded with other naturalists including Linnaeus, to whom she sent a box of birds and insects. Her brother Ashton, who lived in New York, sent her specimens of North American birds. The Welsh naturalist Thomas Pennant studied these bird specimens and included them in his book Arctic Zoology. After her father's death, Blackburne and her museum moved to nearby Fairfield Hall. When she died in 1793, her nephew John Blackburne inherited the collection. Several species are named after Blackburne, including the beetle Geotrupes blackburnii, the Blackburnian warbler and the flowering plant Blackburnia pinnata, now called Zanthoxylum pinnatum.

== Family background and early life ==
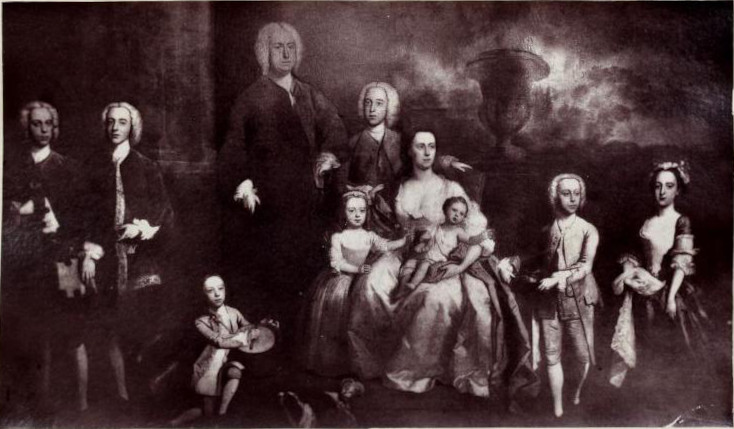
John Blackburne and family, by Hamlet Winstanley. Anna is on the far right.

Anna Blackburne was born in 1726 at Orford Hall, Warrington, to John Blackburne and Catherine Ashton (or Katharine Assheton; 1701–1740), as the fourth or fifth of nine children. (Note: Wystrach states that John Blackburne died in 1787, but the Oxford Dictionary of National Biography gives 20 December 1786 as date of death.) (Note: Several sources, for example Kendrick 1854, incorrectly state that Blackburne was born in 1740, but her tombstone is inscribed "Died Dec. 30, 1793, aged 67". Her obituary in The Gentleman's Magazine stated she was "advanced in age" when she died in 1793.) Her maternal grandfather was William Assheton, Rector of Prestwich, and the collector Ashton Lever, who established the Leverian Museum, was a cousin on her mother's side. She was baptised as "Anne" on 3 January 1726, (Note: Dates in this article follow the convention that the Old Style of the Julian calendar is used until 1752, but the start of the year is adjusted to 1 January, and later dates use the Gregorian calendar. The parish register uses the old start of the year and lists the date of baptism as 3 January 1725.) but was usually known as "Anna". Her family were landowners who had lived at Orford Hall since 1638. They also owned merchant ships, were involved in trade with Russia, and produced salt in Cheshire that was then exported from Salthouse Dock in Liverpool. John Blackburne was interested in botany and had a large collection of plants in his garden. In his hothouses, he grew exotic plants including pineapples and cotton. Some of this cotton was noted to have been made into a muslin dress for his daughter. Little is known about Anna's early education, but she may have used the natural history books in her father's library to study botany during her childhood. In the years following her mother's 1740 death, Anna's surviving siblings left Orford Hall until eventually only Anna, who became the mistress of the manor, and her father remained. Her brother John was a businessman who served as mayor of Liverpool in 1760–61 and was involved in the slave trade before 1758; her brother Ashton lived in New York, from where he sent bird specimens to his sister. Anna referred to herself as "Mrs. Blackburne" although she never married; the title "Mrs." was customarily used also by unmarried ladies of the 18th century.

== Association and correspondence with other naturalists ==
Blackburne was keenly interested in natural history, and her biographer V. P. Wystrach described her as a "patroness of natural history". Natural history as a field of study was not precisely defined but certainly included the study of natural objects and organisms. Blackburne did not contribute to botany and ornithology as an author in her own right, but she was widely known for the extensive and influential collection that she assembled, and she has been described as a "botanist". She was in contact with several well-known naturalists, and some of them visited her and her father at Orford Hall. She learned Latin so she could study the Systema Naturae of Linnaeus. Occasionally, Blackburne visited London and Oxford; on one such visit to the botanical garden at Oxford, she debated with the gardeners about the geranium and surprised the bystanders with the extent of her botanical knowledge. She collected natural history specimens including insects, shells, minerals and birds. In the early years of her collection, she obtained most of her specimens from her widely travelled family members; she later bartered and exchanged specimens with other collectors.

=== Johann Reinhold Forster ===
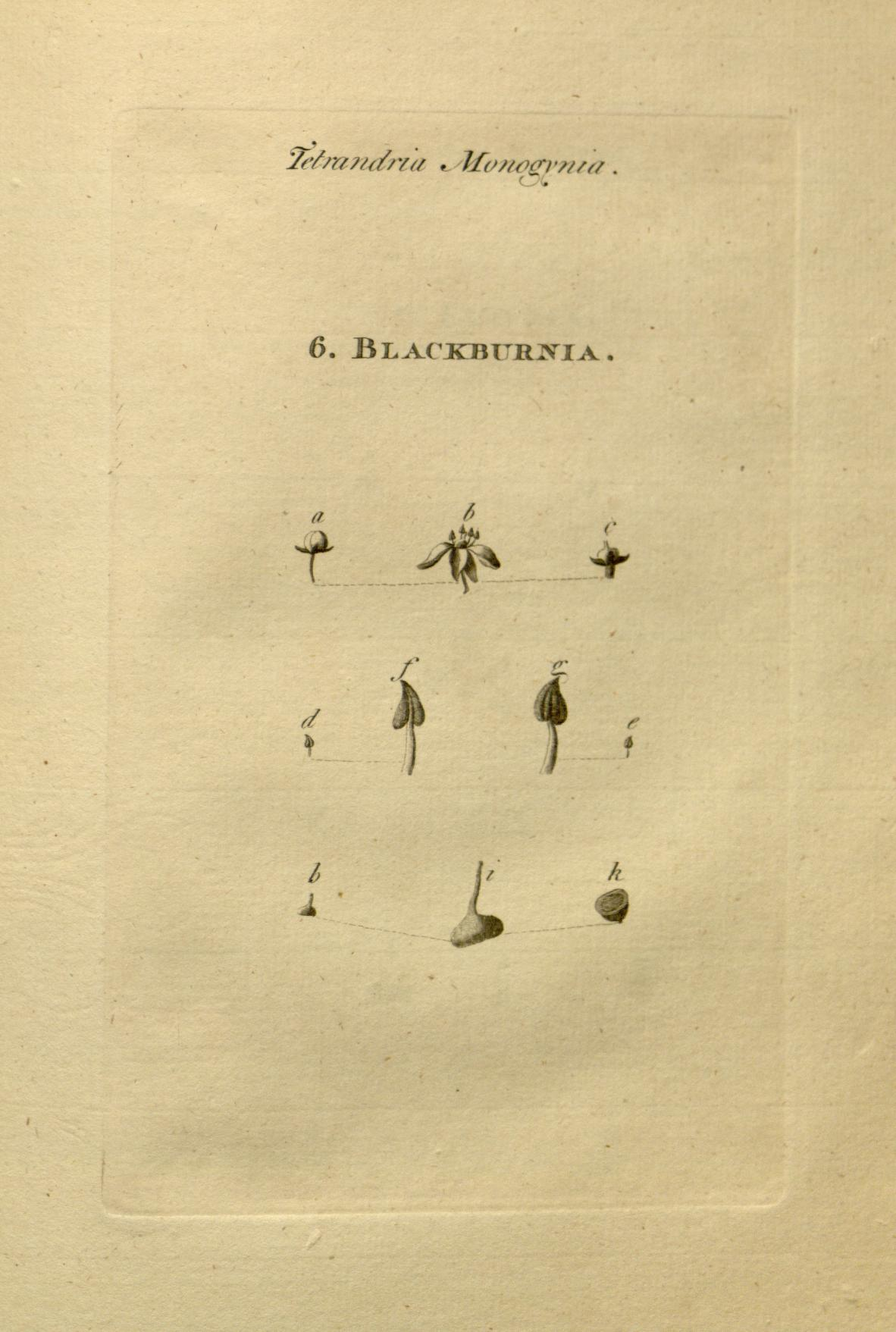
Blackburnia (Zanthoxylum pinnatum), engraving of botanical drawings by Georg Forster, from Characteres generum plantarum

One of the naturalists who visited the Blackburnes was Johann Reinhold Forster, who in 1767 had been appointed as tutor in modern languages and natural history at Warrington Academy. Forster's scientific lectures at Warrington covered biology, entomology and mineralogy. In 1768, Forster dined at Orford Hall every Saturday, helped Blackburne with the arrangement of her insect collection, and read his lectures on entomology to her. Blackburne allowed Forster to use the family's library, and encouraged him to publish his work. For his friend Thomas Pennant, another naturalist, Forster unsuccessfully tried to obtain duplicates of shells in her collection. Until he moved to London in 1770, Forster and Blackburne had a mutually beneficial relationship. While she received education, he benefitted from their social relationship and her library. Forster even expected Blackburne to order books for him. Forster later took part in the second voyage of James Cook as the expedition's naturalist. After his return, he and his son Georg published some of the botanical results of the voyage in the book Characteres generum plantarum. The book was printed in both quarto and folio formats. Blackburne received one of the few folio copies, which were given by the Forsters as presents to royalty as well as friends and supporters. (Note: The whereabouts of this copy are unknown as of 2015. It is known to have been advertised for sale in 1944.) Forster dedicated one genus of plants to Blackburne and her father, Blackburnia, including Blackburnia pinnata, now called Zanthoxylum pinnatum. In the dedication, Forster mentioned John's garden and Anna's collections, thanking both for allowing him to use their "most informative museum".

=== Carl Linnaeus ===
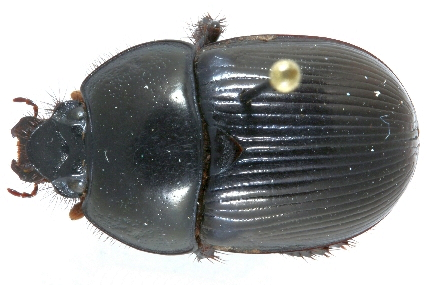
Geotrupes blackburnii, named after Blackburne by Johan Fabricius

Blackburne wrote a letter to the Swedish botanist and zoologist Carl Linnaeus on 29 June 1771, offering to send him "a few Birds & insects" collected by her brother Ashton near New York. Linnaeus thanked her in his reply, written in Latin, and promised to name a new species after her if she gave him an unknown specimen. In response, Blackburne sent "a small box containing a few Birds and insects". These three letters are all that is known of their correspondence. The claims in her obituary that Blackburne was a "friend and constant correspondent of Linnaeus" or that he named a plant after her are exaggerated. Linnaeus's student Johan Christian Fabricius visited Orford Hall, where he examined her collection of insects, and found a new species of beetle. He called it Scarabaeus blackburnii; it is now called Geotrupes blackburnii.

=== Thomas Pennant ===
The naturalist Thomas Pennant, who had been aware of Blackburne and her collections through correspondence with Forster since at least 1768, visited Orford Hall in May 1772. He later described the visit in his 1774 book, A Tour in Scotland, and Voyage to the Hebrides, where he praised John Blackburne's botanical collections and noted about Anna, "Mrs. Blackburne his daughter extends her researches still farther, and adds to her empire another kingdom; not content with the botanic, she causes North America to be explored for its animals, and has formed a museum from the other side of the Atlantic, as pleasing as it is instructive." Pennant studied the collection of birds that Blackburne's brother Ashton had sent to her from America, which resulted in him including more than a hundred species of birds from New York alone in his book Arctic Zoology. The book's preface contained extensive thanks to the Blackburnes for their contribution:

To the rich museum of American Birds, preserved by Mrs. Anna Blackburn, of Orford, near Warrington, I am indebted for the opportunity of describing almost every one known in the provinces of Jersey, New York, and Connecticut. They were sent over to that lady by her brother the late Mr. Ashton Blackburn; who added to the skill and zeal of a sportsman, the most pertinent remarks on the specimens he collected for his worthy and philosophical sister.

— Thomas Pennant, Arctic Zoology, 1784

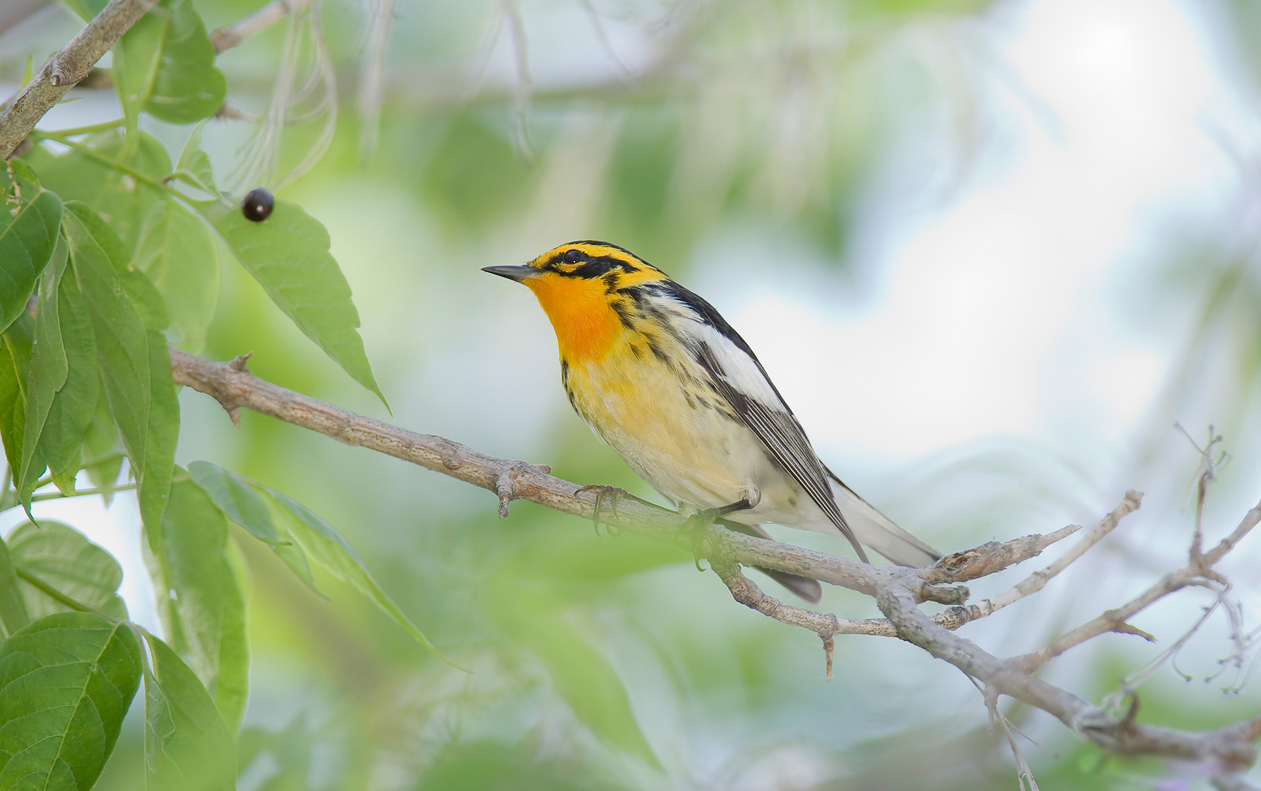
2010 photograph of a Blackburnian warbler

Pennant named the Blackburnian warbler in honour of Anna Blackburne. In 1975, V. P. Wystrach determined that sixteen or seventeen of the bird species accepted by the American Ornithologists' Union were originally described by Pennant from specimens sent to Blackburne by her brother Ashton. Other than birds, Pennant acknowledged the Blackburne museum as the source for the descriptions of a mammal, a salamander, 3 species of fish, and 52 insects, also within Arctic Zoology. Pennant did not acknowledge Blackburne's contributions in his autobiography.

=== Other naturalists ===
The German naturalist Peter Simon Pallas corresponded with Pennant during his career. He lived in St. Petersburg and had collected natural history specimens during an expedition to Siberia. Pennant probably introduced Pallas to Blackburne, and the two started exchanging specimens in 1778, sometimes using ships belonging to Blackburne's brother John. They exchanged mostly plants, preserved birds, and minerals, but also other animals, including a young musk deer that Blackburne obtained from Pallas in 1779. Some of the exchanges were mediated by the publisher Benjamin White. At some point between 1771 and 1779, Blackburne also became acquainted with the naturalist Joseph Banks, who also served as an intermediary between her and Pallas, and with botanist Daniel Solander as well. The naturalist Emanuel Mendes da Costa was also in contact with Blackburne and offered to catalogue her collection of minerals. Possibly because of his previous misappropriation of Royal Society funds, Blackburne did not employ him although she did express interest.

== Personal life ==
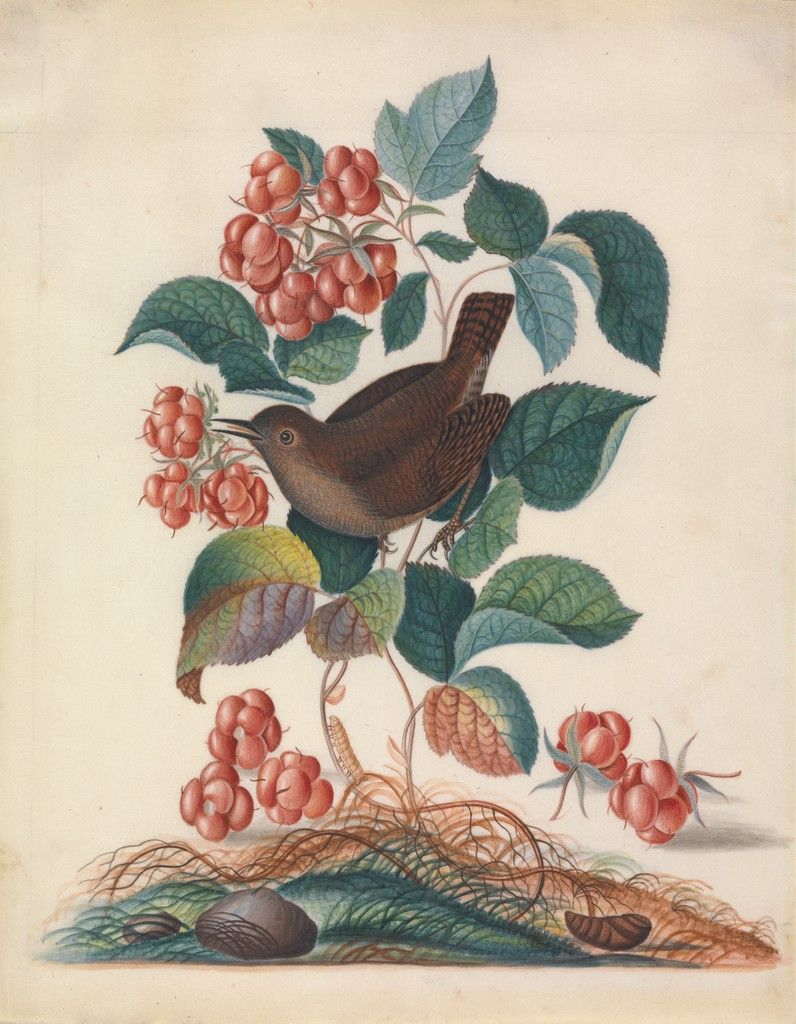
Eurasian wren, raspberry, wood lice and pupa from the Natural History Cabinet of Anna Blackburne, by James Bolton

Anna Blackburne assembled a museum with an extensive collection of natural history specimens, comparable to the Leverian collection of her cousin Ashton Lever. The museum included a herbarium of preserved plant specimens, a collection of 470 birds and one bat preserved by taxidermy, specimens of insects, corals and shells, as well as fossils, ores, and minerals. She probably also commissioned drawings of her specimens, and around 1768 the illustrator James Bolton made several watercolours and gouaches from objects in her collection. After her father's 1786 death, Blackburne moved in 1787 from Orford Hall to Fairfield Hall, which was a new home built for her with a room designed to house her collections. The room was 15 yards (14 m) long, as wide as the entire front of the house. She also had plans for a botanical garden, but was unable to carry these out due to health issues. She died on 30 December 1793, and was buried in the churchyard of St Oswald's Church, Winwick. In her will, she bequeathed more than £12,000 (equivalent to £1,440,000 in 2023) to her family and to charity. Her museum was inherited by her nephew John Blackburne, the son of her brother Thomas, and John moved selected parts of the collection to his manor at Hale Hall. The Blackburne family homes at Orford, Fairfield and Hale Hall were all demolished in the 20th century, and the eventual fate of the collection is unknown; it was probably dispersed at auctions. Some plant specimens attributed to Blackburne's collection are now in the herbarium of Liverpool Museum, and Bolton's watercolours are in the collection of the Yale Center for British Art.

A crater on Venus has been named "Blackburne" in her honour since 1994. The Blackburne crater is situated at 11.0°N, 183.9°E and has a diameter of 30.1 km.
