= John Blackburne (botanist) =

English businessman, landowner and botanist

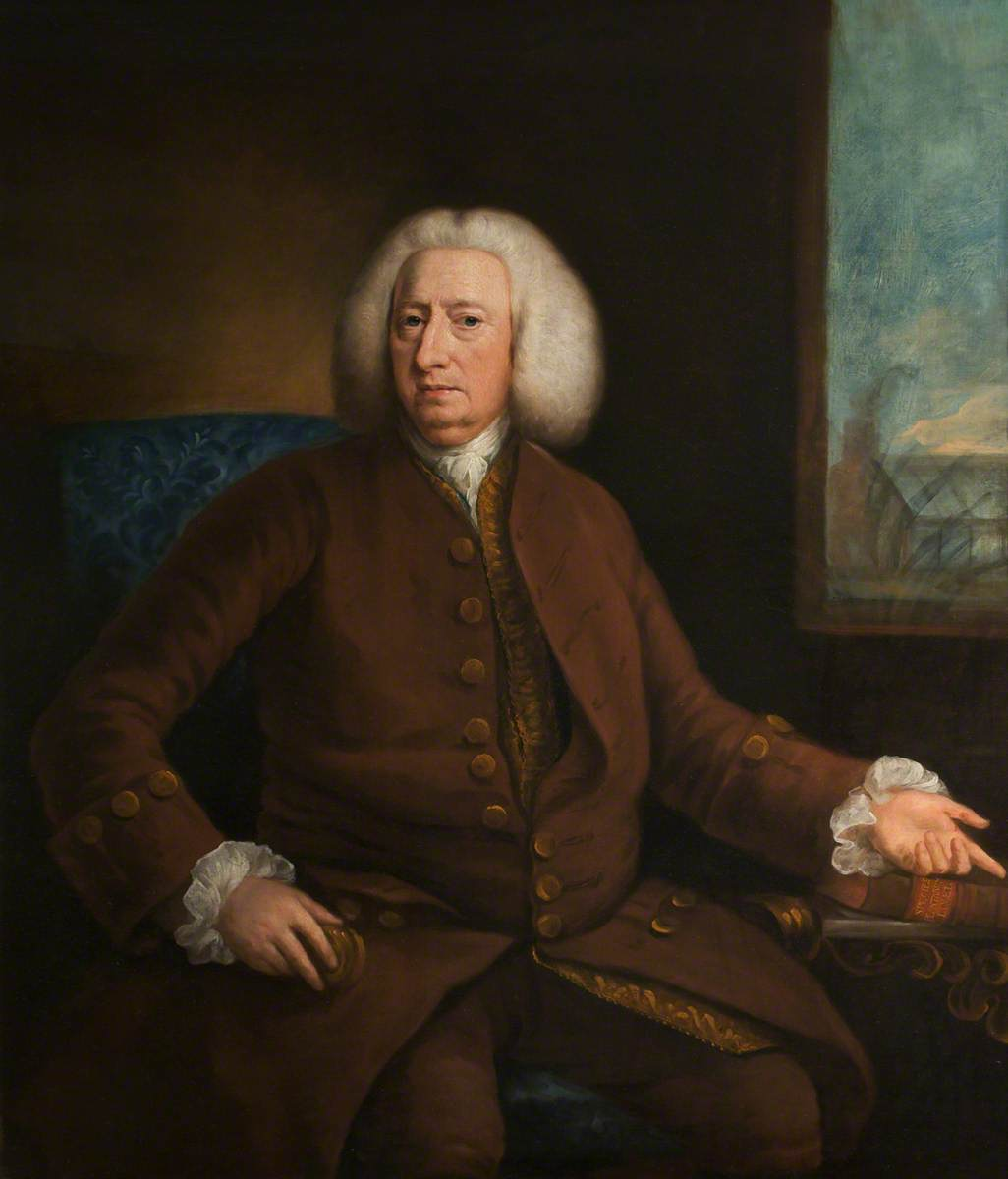
- Blackburne in 1743, by Hamlet Winstanley
- Born: c. 1694
- Died: 1786 (aged 91–92)
- Burial place: St Oswald's Church, Winwick
- Known for: Botany
- Children: 9, including Anna

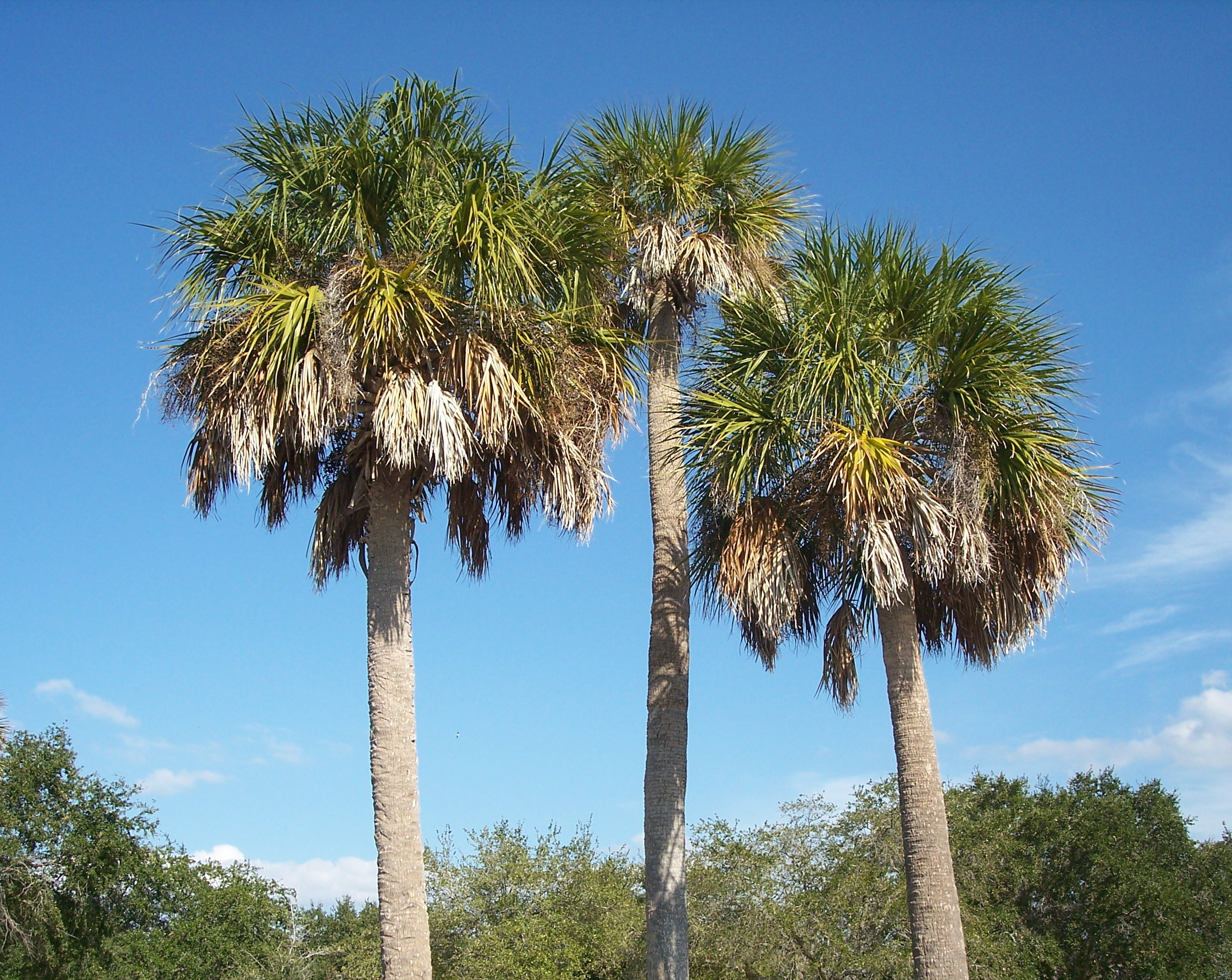
Sabal blackburniana or Sabal palmetto

John Blackburne (baptised 1694 – 1786) was an English businessman, landowner, and amateur botanist.

He was the second son of wealthy salt merchant Jonathan Blackburne of Orford Hall, Warrington, Lancashire (but now Cheshire) and his first wife Anne Lever. He inherited Orford on the death of his father in 1724.

There, in coal-fired hothouses, he established a large exotic plant collection, amongst which were some of the earliest English specimens of pineapple, coffee, tea and sugarcane. He was assisted in his endeavours by his daughter Anna, who became a noted botanist. A detailed catalogue of the whole collection was produced in 1779 by the head gardener, Adam Neal, which has provided the basis of several books. Anna's natural history tutor, Dr Reinhold Forster, who later sailed as naturalist on Cook's second voyage, named a new genus of fan palm, Sabal blackburniana in the family's honour.

Blackburne was selected as High Sheriff of Lancashire for 1743–44, and in 1769 bought the lordship of the manor of Warrington.

== Personal life ==
Blackburne married Catherine Ashton and had 9 children. His eldest son Thomas, High Sheriff in 1763, predeceased him, and thus his estate passed to Thomas' son John, the Member of Parliament (MP) for Lancashire. His second son John became Mayor of Liverpool. A younger son named Ashton emigrated to the United States and collected bird specimens, many of them new to science. His daughter Anna was a respected botanist and naturalist in her own right and corresponded with Carl Linnaeus and Johann Reinhold Forster.

He died in 1786 at the age of 93 and was buried at St Oswald's Church, Winwick.
