= Hortus semper virens =

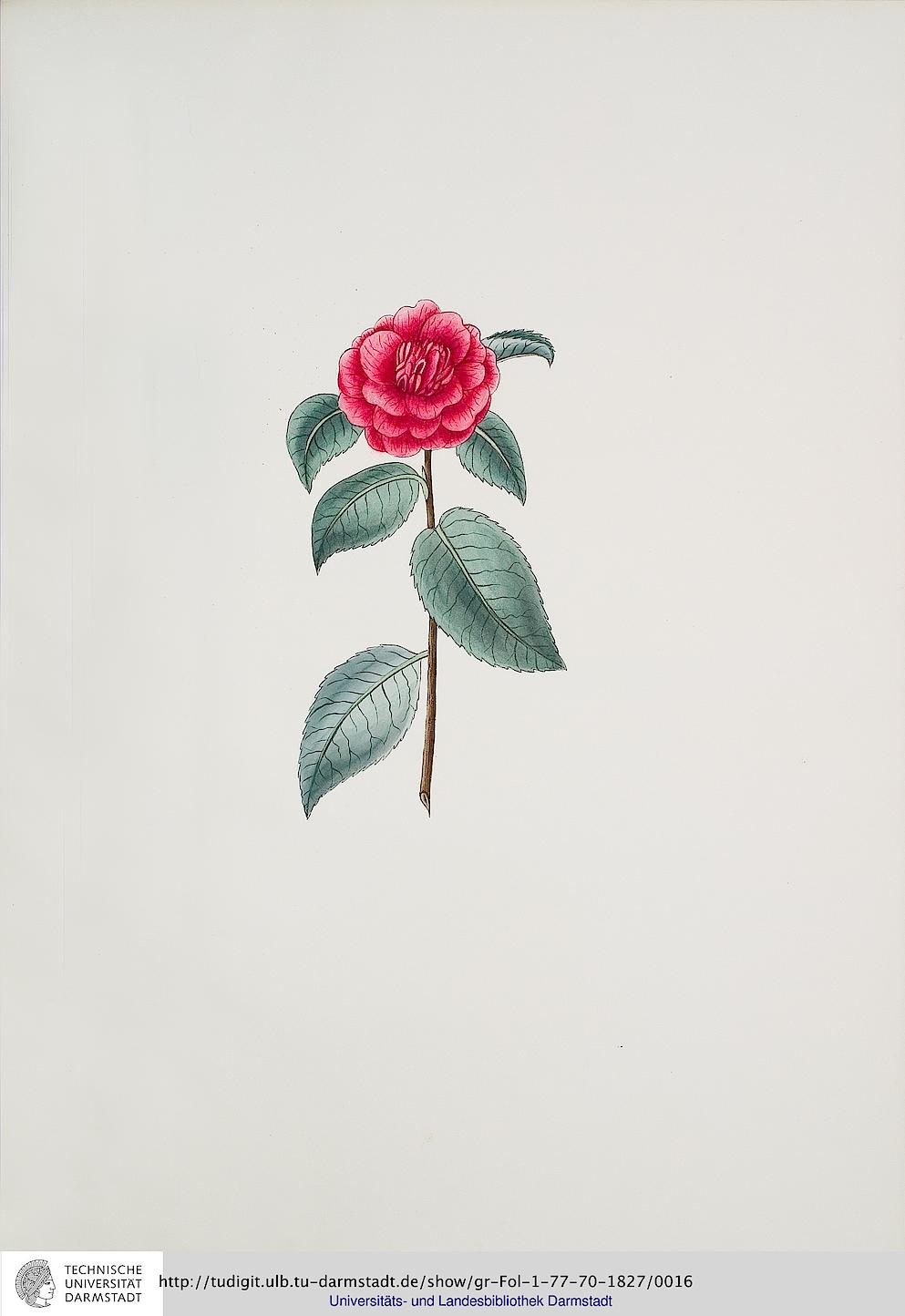
- Camelia Florida
- Author: Johann Simon von Kerner
- Original title: Hortus semper virens: exhibens icones plantarum selectiorum
- Illustrator: Hans Verhagen den Stommen
- Publication date: 1827
- Media type: lithograph on paper
- Universitäts- und Landesbibliothek Darmstadt

Hortus semper virens is a botanical reference book by Johann Simon von Kerner, from 1827.

== Description ==
The page size is 65.5 x 49 centimeters. It is in the collection of the Universitäts- und Landesbibliothek Darmstadt.

== Analysis ==
It is a set of twelve prints with latin description.
