= Characteres generum plantarum =

Book by Johann Reinhold Forster and Georg Forster

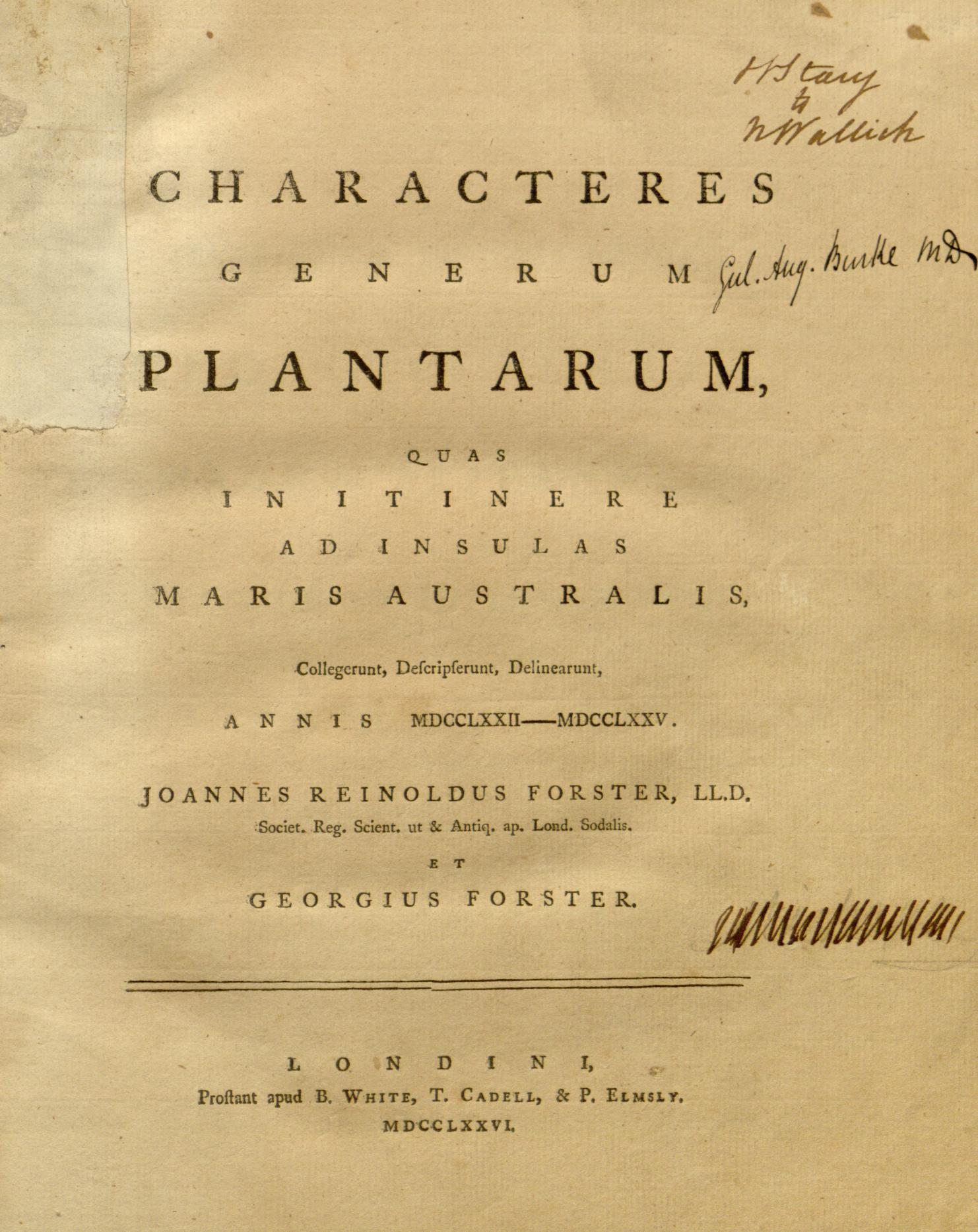
Title page of the 1776 quarto edition of Characteres generum plantarum

Characteres generum plantarum (complete title Characteres generum plantarum, quas in Itinere ad Insulas Maris Australis, Collegerunt, Descripserunt, Delinearunt, annis MDCCLXXII-MDCCLXXV Joannes Reinoldus Forster et Georgius Forster, "Characteristics of the types of plants collected, described, and delineated during a voyage to islands of the South Seas, in the years 1772–1775 by Johann Reinhold Forster and Georg Forster") is a 1775/1776 book by Johann Reinhold Forster and Georg Forster about the botanical discoveries they made during the second voyage of James Cook.

The book contains 78 plates, the majority of which depict dissections of flowers at natural size. The book introduced 94 binomial names from 75 genera, of which 43 are still the accepted names today. Many plant genera were named after friends or patrons of the Forsters. The book was published in a folio and a quarto edition and translated into German in 1779. It is an important book as the earliest publication of names and descriptions of the native species of New Zealand.

== Background ==
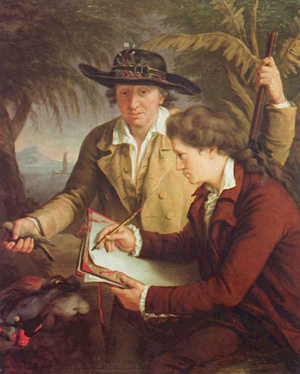
Johann Reinhold Forster and Georg Forster, by John Francis Rigaud, London 1780. The plant in the brim of the hat is a Forstera sedifolia and the bird in Reinhold Forster's hand a New Zealand bellbird.

Johann Reinhold Forster was the main scientific companion travelling with James Cook on his 1772–1775 second voyage. His son Georg Forster accompanied him as draughtsman and assistant. Botanical specimens were collected by Georg and Anders Sparrman, a student of Carl Linnaeus who had been hired as an assistant by Reinhold Forster. After the return to England, Characteres generum plantarum was the first scientific publication to come out of the voyage. Reinhold Forster tried to use it to enhance his own reputation as a scientist and to compete with the first voyage's botanist, Joseph Banks. He was uneasy that Banks might already have described and published most of the species names and wanted to be able to claim the discovery of the species he found as his own achievement.

Characteres was prepared during the voyage, written quickly and contained numerous errors. Reinhold Forster later regretted its rushed publication and not having consulted Banks for his opinions and access to his collections. Cook unsuccessfully attempted to halt the book's publication in the autumn of 1775, possibly in order to prevent any preemption of his own narrative, but Lord Sandwich, the First Lord of the Admiralty, gave his permission for the book to be published at Forster's own expense. The first folio edition was presented to King George III in November 1775, probably on 17 November; this also effectively made it impossible for Sandwich to withdraw the permission for publication.

== Content ==
The book starts with an introduction that dedicates it to King George III, explains the context of the journey and describes the methods used and the contributions by Reinhold and Georg Forster as well as Sparrman. It also contains an apology for containing only 75 genera. While the two Forsters are listed as authors, Georg Forster later stated that the descriptions were all by him and Sparrman, as his father was more concerned with zoology. The book contains 78 plates depicting the plants. These are described by Dan Nicolson as "almost all of floral dissections at natural size, hence unappealing".

The plants were named according to the Linnaean model. For some of them, local names or usage influenced the choice of names. For example, Diospyros including Diospyros major were called Maba by the Forsters, referring to their Tongan name. Xylosma were named Myroxylon ("myrrh tree"), referring to the inhabitants' use of it to scent coconut-based hair oil. Many genera were named after friends or potential patrons, including Barringtonia, honouring Daines Barrington, and Pennantia, named after Thomas Pennant.

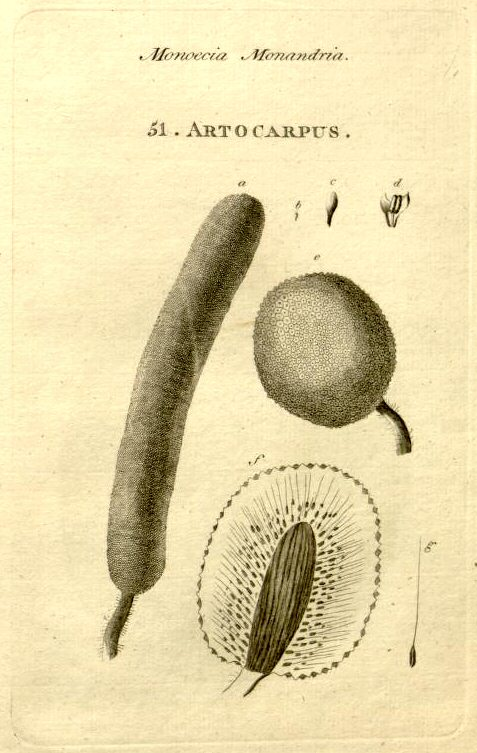
Plate 51 Artocarpus, the breadfruit genus, anatomical details of fruit

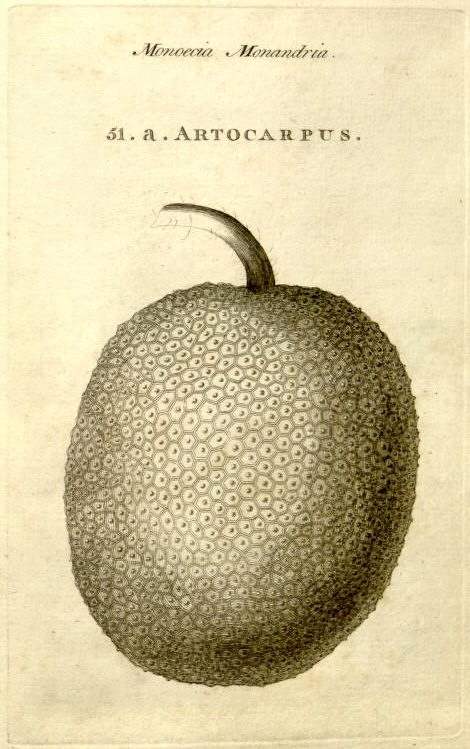
Plate 51.a Artocarpus, whole breadfruit

== Editions, formats and owners ==
The book was printed in both folio and quarto formats, with the folios intended as presents for friends, supporters and potential patrons of the Forsters. The majority is dated 1776, with one quarto and two folios from 1775 known. It is likely that both folio and quarto editions were printed in November 1775. The two 1775 folios are the one presented to George III and another one sent by Reinhold Forster to Linnaeus in November 1775. According to a letter from Reinhold Forster, 25 folio copies were made, of which at least 16 folios have been traced, including the copies of Joseph Banks, Thomas Pennant, and Nikolaus Joseph von Jacquin. The copy dedicated to Charles III of Spain is now in the library of the University of California, Los Angeles, while the current whereabouts of the one originally belonging to Anna Blackburne (which was offered for sale in 1944) are unknown. Of the quarto edition, at least 200, probably several hundred copies were printed, and it was published and widely available in January or February 1776, selling for £1 7s.

The book was translated into German by Johann Simon von Kerner, head of the Botanical Gardens of Stuttgart, appearing in 1779. The original Latin was reprinted in Volume 6 of Georg Forster's complete works, which were published by the German Academy of Sciences at Berlin and continued by the Berlin-Brandenburg Academy of Sciences and Humanities.

== Importance and controversy ==
The book is an important contribution to the botany of New Zealand, as the first publication containing names and descriptions of its native species. The earlier observations by Banks and Solander from the first voyage of James Cook were only published much later. Of the 94 binomials from 75 genera in the book, 43 are the accepted names even today, and for seven others, the generic name is still used while the binomials are no longer the accepted names.

William Wales, the astronomer on the voyage with Cook, stated he had "not been able to extract any information what[so]ever, except that they found, in the whole 75 New Plants, but whether those are all, or any of them, different from such as had been discovered by Mr Banks, he cannot learn." Later, Elmer Drew Merrill accused the Forsters both of pirating Solander's work in Characteres and of not using Solander's names; however, there is no evidence that they had access to Solander's or Banks's manuscripts after the voyage. The botanists Dan Henry Nicolson and Francis Raymond Fosberg, who studied the botanical contributions of the Forsters to Cook's second voyage, note that the work was not plagiarised from Solander, but done during the expedition, as evidenced by Forster manuscripts from the voyage that Merrill was not aware of.
