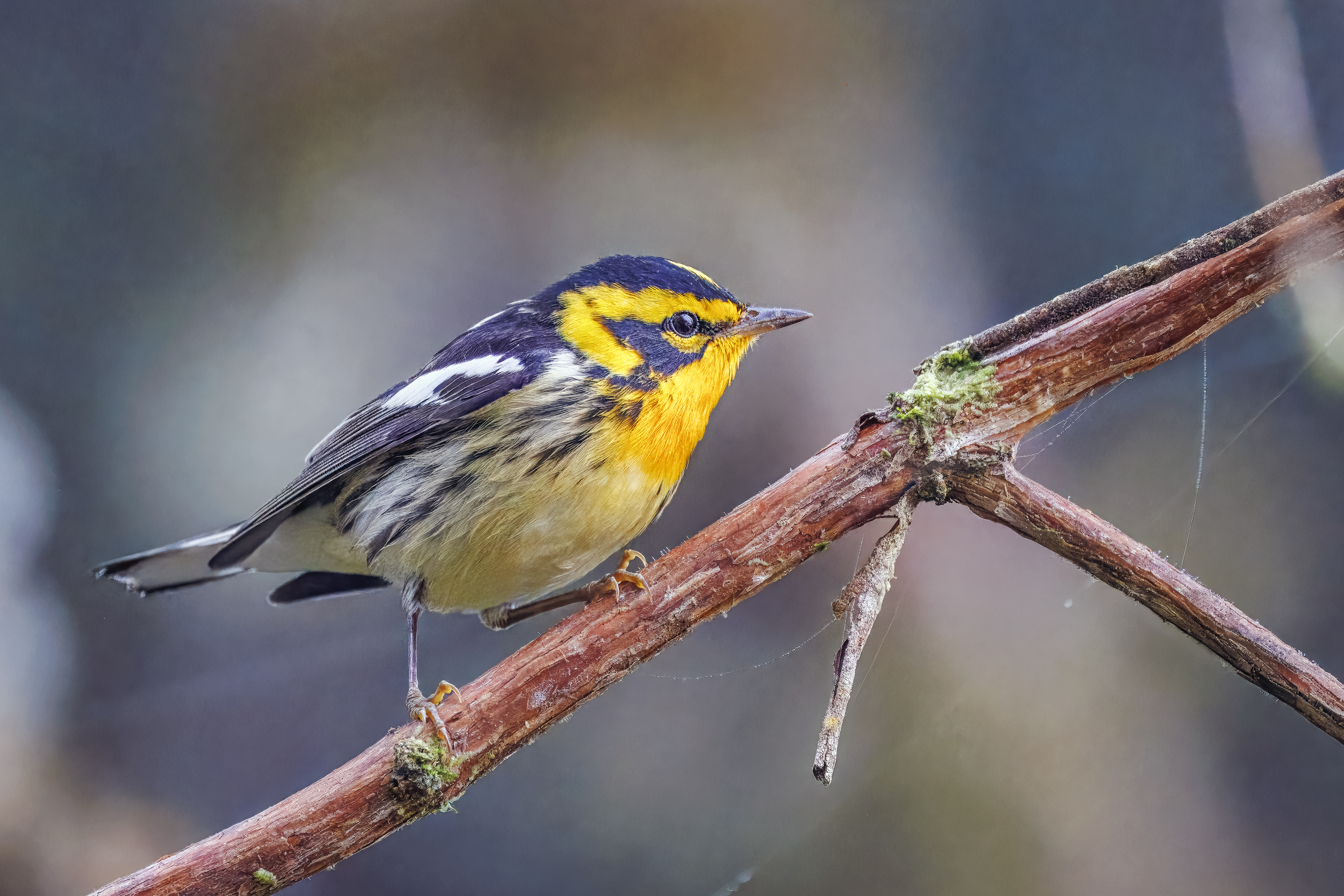
- Male in Ecuador
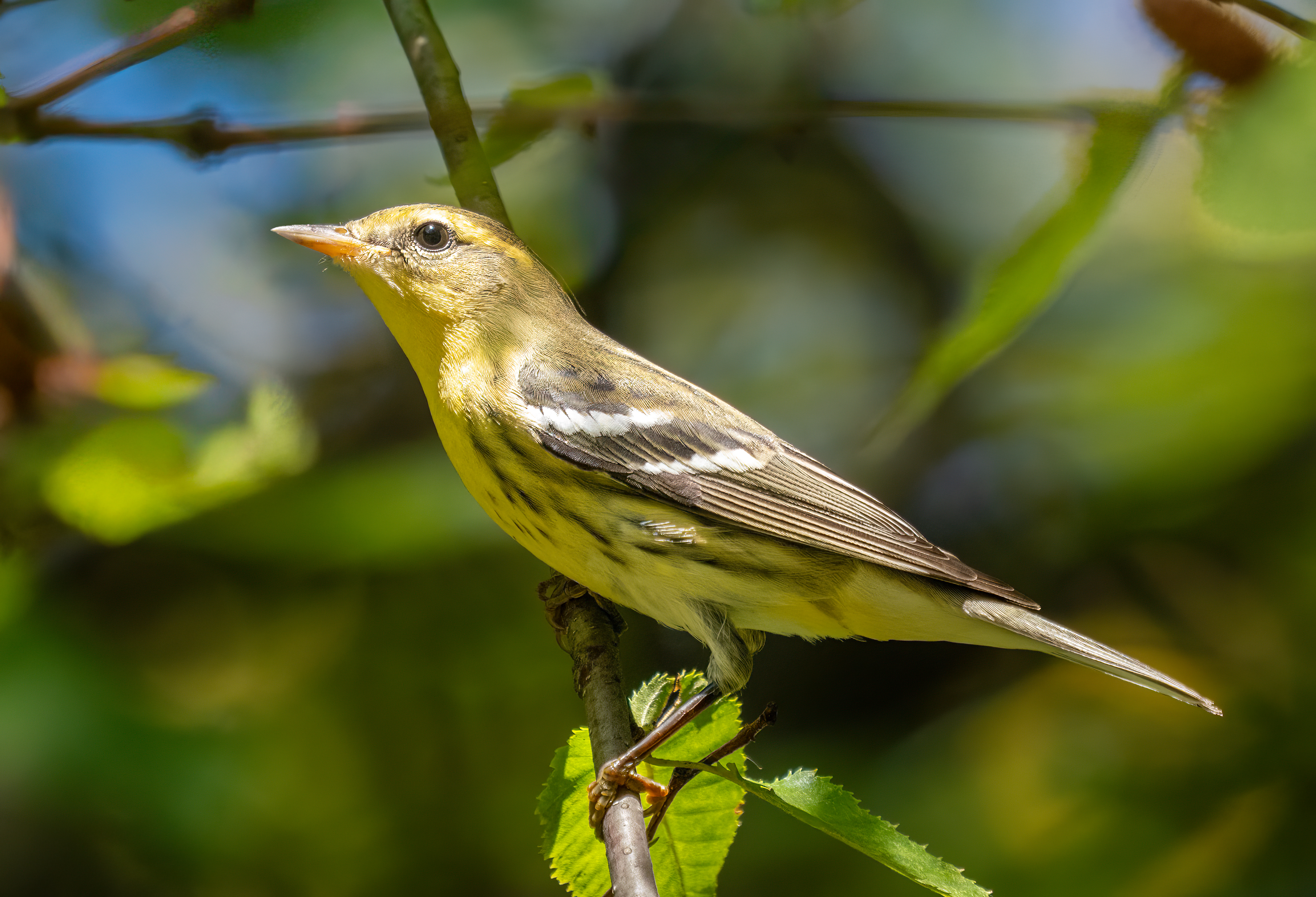
- Female or immature male in New York

Conservation status
- Least Concern (IUCN 3.1)

Scientific classification
- Kingdom: Animalia
- Phylum: Chordata
- Class: Aves
- Order: Passeriformes
- Family: Parulidae
- Genus: Setophaga
- Species: S. fusca

Binomial name
- Setophaga fusca (Müller, 1776)
- Range of S. fusca Breeding range Wintering range

Synonyms
- Dendroica blackburniae Dendroica fusca

= Blackburnian warbler =

Species of bird

The Blackburnian warbler (Setophaga fusca) is a small New World warbler. They breed in eastern North America, from southern Canada, westwards to the southern Canadian Prairies, the Great Lakes region and New England, to North Carolina. They are migratory, wintering in southern Central America and South America, and are very rare vagrants to western Europe. The common name honors the English botanist Anna Blackburne.

== Taxonomy ==
The Blackburnian warbler was formally described in 1776 by the German zoologist Philipp Statius Müller under the binomial name Motacilla fusca. The specific epithet is Latin meaning "dusky", "black" or "brown". Müller based his account on a handcoloured plate of the "Figuier étranger" that had been engraved by François-Nicolas Martinet to accompany the Comte de Buffon's multivolume work Histoire Naturelle des Oiseaux. The type location is French Guiana. The Blackburnian warbler is now placed in the genus Setophaga that was introduced by the English naturalist William Swainson in 1827. The genus name Setophaga combines the Ancient Greek σης/sēs, σητος/sētos meaning "moth" with -φαγος/-phagos meaning "-eating". The species is monotypic: no subspecies are recognised. The common name was introduced in 1785 by the Welsh naturalist Thomas Pennant to honour Anna Blackburne, an English botanist.

== Description ==
Singing in the Porcupine Mountains, Michigan

Blackburnian warblers are small passerines and average-sized wood-warblers. They measure around 11 to 13 cm (4.3 to 5.1 in) long, with a 20 to 22 cm (7.9 to 8.7 in) wingspan, and weigh 8 to 13 g (0.28 to 0.46 oz). The average mass of an adult bird is 9.7 g (0.34 oz), although is slightly higher in fall due to fat reserves, averaging 10.2–10.4 g (0.36–0.37 oz). Among standard measurements, the wing chord is 6.3 to 7.3 cm (2.5 to 2.9 in), the tail is 4.2 to 5 cm (1.7 to 2.0 in), the bill is 0.9 to 1 cm (0.35 to 0.39 in) and the tarsus is 1.6 to 1.8 cm (0.63 to 0.71 in). In summer, male Blackburnian warblers display dark gray backs and double white wing bars, with yellowish rumps and dark brown crowns. The underparts of these birds are white and are tinged with yellow and streaked black. The head is strongly patterned in yellow and black, with a flaming-orange throat. It is the only North American warbler with this striking plumage. Other plumages, including the fall male and adult female, are washed-out versions of the summer male, and in particular, lack the bright colors and strong head pattern. The Blackburnian warbler is practically unmistakable if seen well, even the female due to her dull-yellow supercilium, contrasting with greyish cheeks and yellow throat contrasting with the dark streaky sides and back. The only other wood-warbler with an orange throat is the flame-throated warbler of Central America, which is very distinctive, lacking the contrasting blackish streaking about the head and whitish underside of a male Blackburnian. Basic plumages show weaker yellows and gray in place of black in the breeding male.

Blackburnian warblers' songs are a simple series of high swi notes, which often ascend in pitch. Transliterations have included zip zip zip zip zip zip zip zip, titititi tseeeeee or teetsa teetsa teetsa teetsa. Their call is a high sip. Genetic research has shown that their close living relative is the bay-breasted warbler, the latter species perhaps specialized to forage in the same coniferous trees at lower levels. Hybridization in the wild has been recorded once each with a bay-breasted warbler (in West Virginia), with a black-and-white warbler (in Pennsylvania), and possibly a wintering hybrid with a Kirtland's warbler (in Hispaniola).

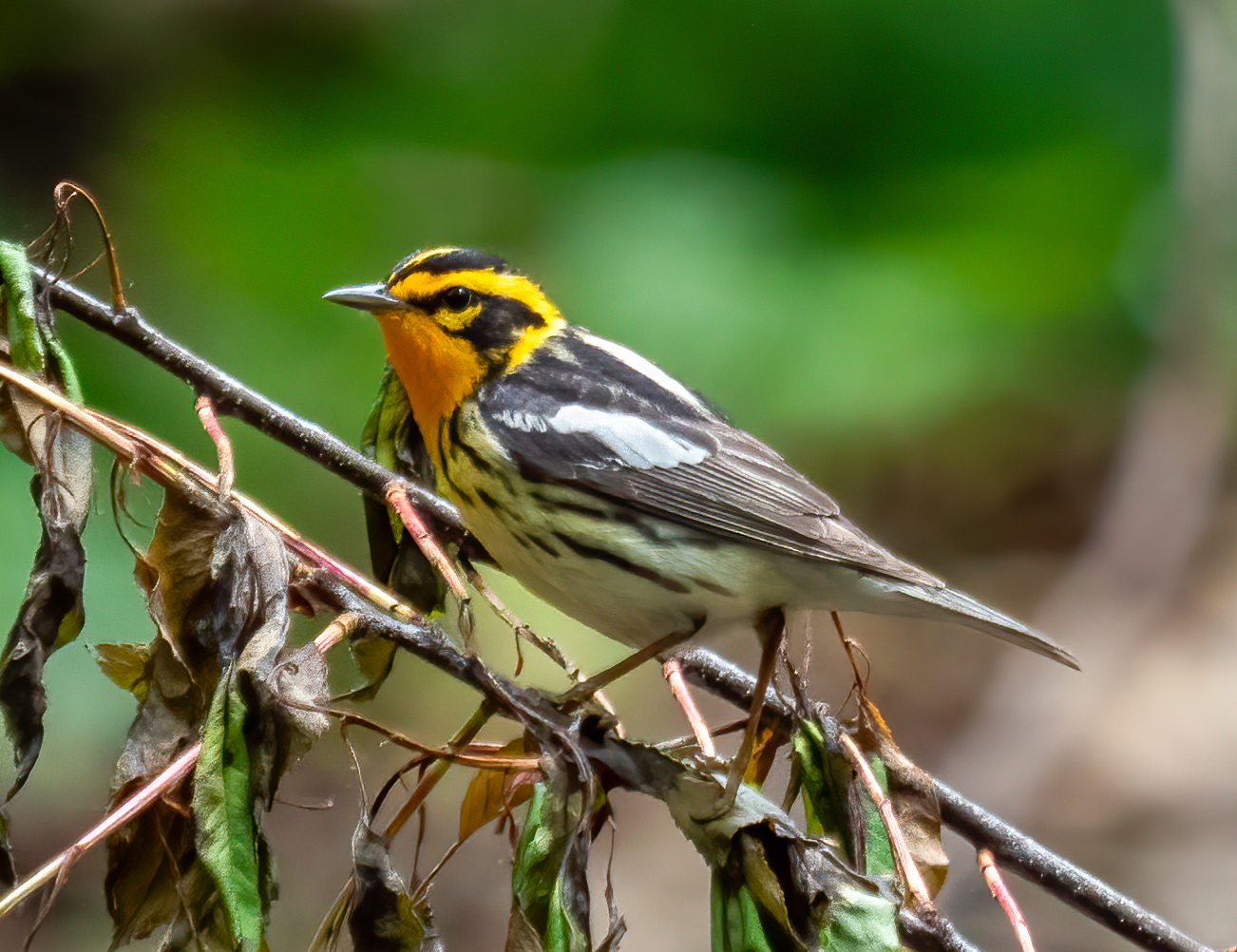
male, New York

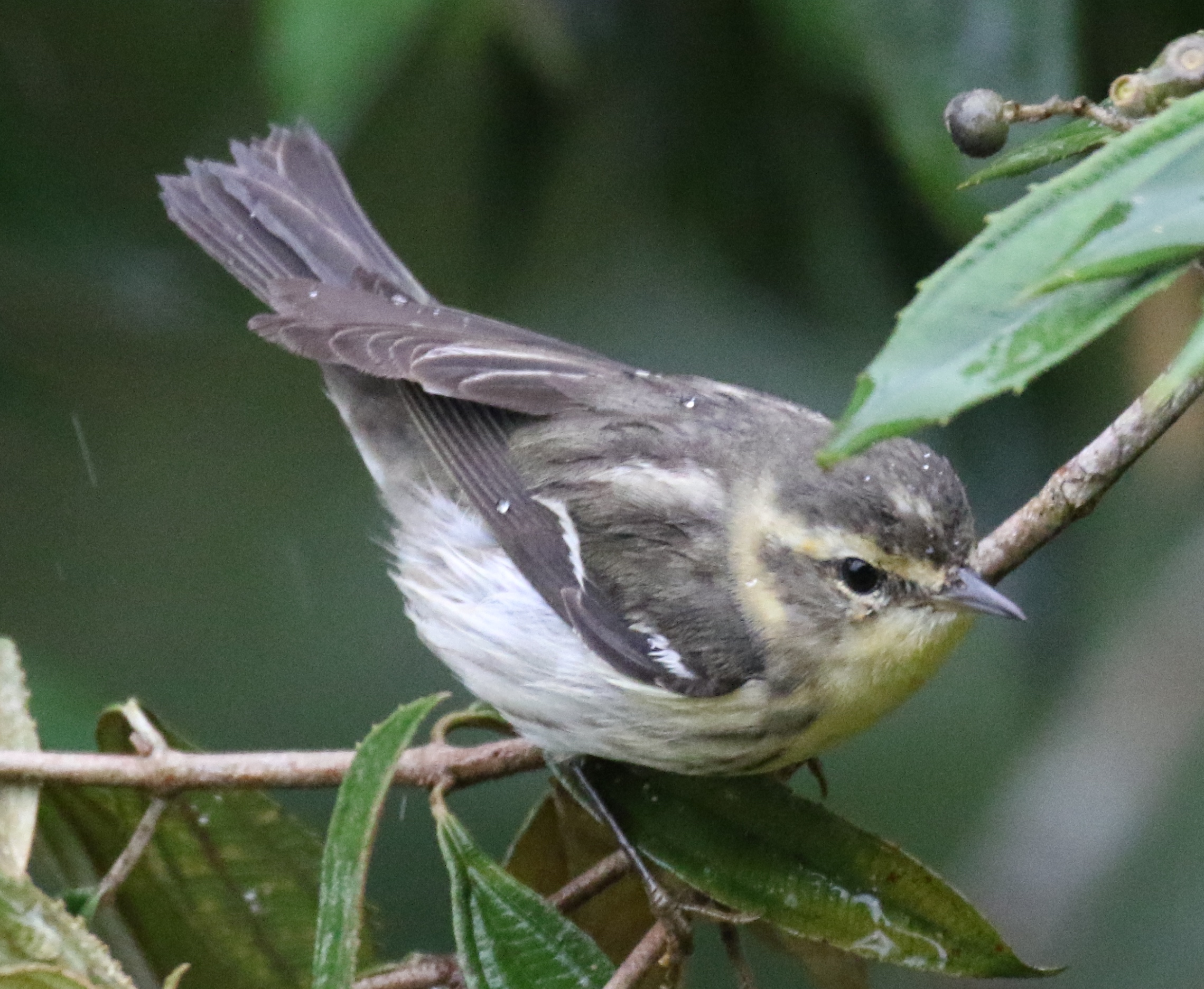
1st winter, Costa Rica

== Ecology ==
Blackburnian warblers are solitary during winter, highly territorial on their breeding grounds, and do not mix with other passerine species outside of the migratory period. However, during migration, they often join local mixed foraging flocks of species such as chickadees, kinglets, and nuthatches. Similarly, in the tropics, they were found to be fairly social while engaging in migration but solitary from other passerines while wintering. These birds are basically insectivorous but will include berries in their diets in wintertime. They usually forage by searching for insects or spiders in treetops. Their breeding season diet is dominated by the larvae of Lepidoptera, i.e. moths and butterflies. They may help control the spruce budworm (often considered a harmful pest) when breakouts occur, at the local if not at epidemic level. In one study from Ontario, 98% of the diet was made of insects, the remaining 2% being spiders. Among the migratory Setophaga warblers, it is considered one of the specialists at foraging in the micro-habitat of the tree's top canopy.

The breeding habitats of these birds are mature coniferous woodlands, the central part of their breeding range being in the southeastern portion of Canada's boreal forest. However, their distribution as a breeding species continues broadly down much of New England and the Appalachian Mountains, from New York to northernmost Georgia, in elevated mixed woodlands, especially ones containing spruce and hemlocks. Hemlocks in particular are most likely to host Blackburnian warblers in mixed forests. It typically winters in tropical montane forests, from roughly 600 to 2,500 m (2,000 to 8,200 ft), mainly from Colombia to Peru, more sporadically in Panama and the Amazon region.

Blackburnian warblers begin their first clutches in mid-May to early June in the contiguous United States and about 1 to 2 weeks later in Quebec. This species builds a nest consisting of an open cup of twigs, bark, plant fibers, and rootlets held to a branch with a spider web and lined with lichens, moss, hair, and dead pine needles, that is placed near the end of a branch. Although typically only laying one brood per year, if a nest is destroyed they are capable of producing a second or even third brood. Three to five whitish eggs are laid in its nest which is usually placed 2–38 m (6.6–124.7 ft) above the ground, on a horizontal branch. Nests usually constructed outwardly with twigs, bark, plant fibers, and rootlets; lined with lichens, mosses, fine grasses, hair, dead pine needles, and even occasionally such exotic substances as string, willow cotton, horsehair, and cattail down. Only the female broods and spends about 80% day actively brooding, with the male usually helping bring food to the nest. Among warblers, they are relatively rarely parasitized at the nest by brown-headed cowbirds, most likely due to the cowbirds' lack of success in dense pine-dominated forests. Blue jays and American red squirrels have been verified to prey on nestlings and new fledglings, while a merlin was recorded killing a brooding adult female. Sharp-shinned hawks and Cooper's hawks are likely, but not confirmed, predators of adult Blackburnian warblers. By far the greatest threat faced by this species is the destruction of forest habitat, which some predict could cause the Blackburnian warbler to lose up to more than 30% of its wintering or breeding habitat. However, currently, this species continues to occur over a large range and can appear in stable numbers where habitat is appropriate.
