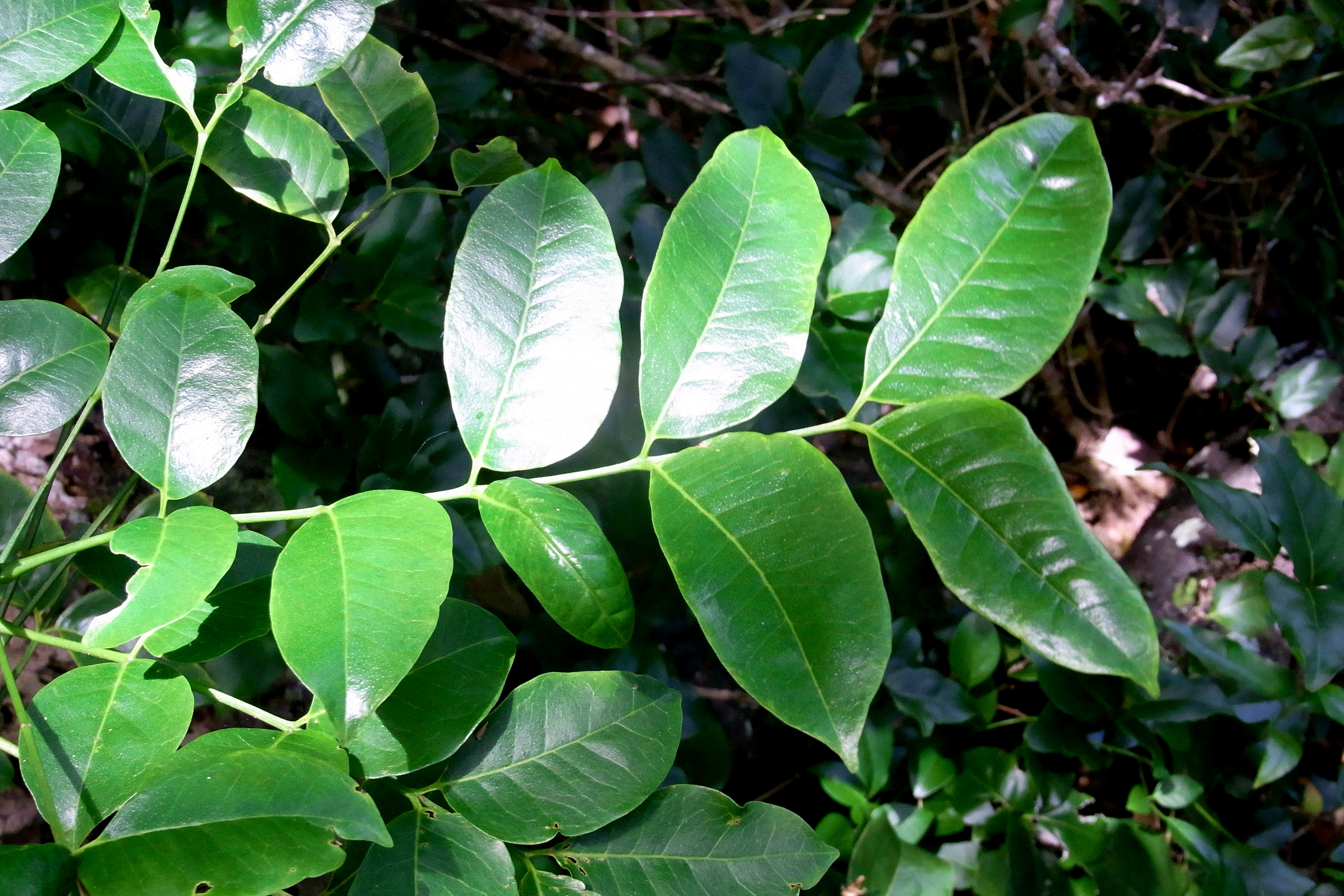

Scientific classification
- Kingdom: Plantae
- Clade: Tracheophytes
- Clade: Angiosperms
- Clade: Eudicots
- Clade: Rosids
- Order: Sapindales
- Family: Rutaceae
- Genus: Zanthoxylum
- Species: Z. pinnatum

Binomial name
- Zanthoxylum pinnatum (J.R.Forst. & G.Forst.) W.R.B.Oliv.

Synonyms
- List: Blackburnia pinnata J.R.Forst. & G.Forst.; Fagara pinnata (J.R.Forst. & G.Forst.) Engl.; Ptelea pinnata (J.R.Forst. & G.Forst.) L.f.; Samara blackburnia Spreng. nom. illeg.; Xanthoxylon blackburnia C.Moore orth. var.; Xanthoxylon howeanum F.Muell. orth. var.; Xanthoxylum blackburnia F.Muell. orth. var.; Zanthoxylum blackburnia Benth. nom. illeg.; Zanthoxylum howeanum F.Muell. nom. inval., nom. nud.; Zanthoxylum pinnata (J.R.Forst. & G.Forst.) W.R.B.Oliv. orth. var.

= Zanthoxylum pinnatum =

Yellow wood

Species of flowering plant

Zanthoxylum pinnatum, commonly known as yellow wood, is a species of flowering plant of the family Rutaceae native to Lord Howe and Norfolk Islands. It is a tree with pinnate leaves, white male and female flowers arranged in groups in leaf axils, and spherical, purple follicles containing a single black seed.

== Description ==
Zanthoxylum pinnatum is a tree that typically grows to a height of 10 m (33 ft). Its leaves are pinnate, usually with four to nine oblong to egg-shaped, slightly curved leaflets, mostly 50–80 mm (2.0–3.1 in) long and 30–45 mm (1.2–1.8 in) wide. The flowers are arranged in small to large groups in leaf axils with separate male and female flowers, the four sepals egg-shaped and 0.5–1 mm (0.020–0.039 in) long, the four or five petals white, lance-shaped and 2.5–3 mm (0.098–0.118 in) long. Flowering occurs from February to March and the fruit is a spherical, purple follicle about 8 mm (0.31 in) long containing a single black seed.

== Taxonomy ==
Yellow wood was first formally described in 1775 by Johann Reinhold Forster and Georg Forster who gave it the name Blackburnia pinnata in their book Characteres Generum Plantarum. In 1917, Walter Oliver changed the name to Zanthoxylum pinnatum in Transactions and Proceedings of the New Zealand Institute.

== Distribution and habitat ==
Zanthoxylum pinnatum grows in forest on Lord Howe and Norfolk Islands but is not common on either island.
