= Orford Hall =

Former country house in Cheshire, England

Coordinates: 53.4072°N 2.5825°W

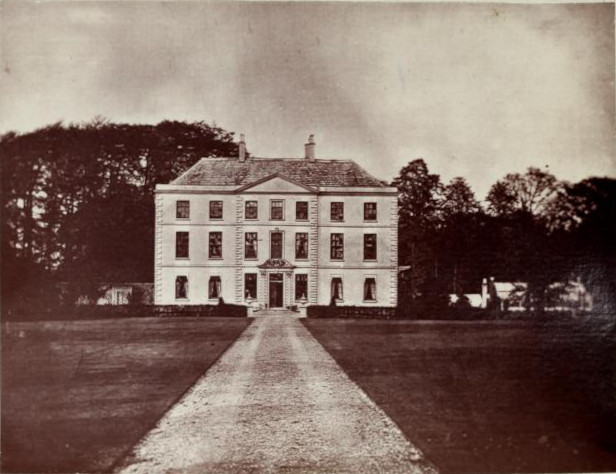
Orford Hall, Warrington, Lancashire before 1881

Orford Hall, now demolished, was a 17th-century country house built in an estate which is now a public park (Orford Park) in Orford, Warrington, England.

== History ==
The original hall at Orford was a timber and plaster building, with ornate chimneys and a thatched roof, which was built for the Le Norris family in 1232. The Norris family occupied the hall until 1595 after which it was acquired by Thomas Tildesley, who rebuilt it in the Jacobean style. At that time the building was known as Norris House.

In 1638 the property was purchased by Thomas Blackburne, a wealthy Cheshire salt merchant, and afterwards inherited by his son Jonathan (1646–1724), High Sheriff of Lancashire for 1715, who made extensive improvements to the house. It was afterwards occupied by Jonathan's son John Blackburne (1694–1786), a well-known naturalist and horticulturalist, whose daughter was Anna Blackburne, the noted botanist. At that time the hall was well known for its outstanding collection of rare plants, trees and unusual animals and the hothouse in the grounds was the first in the country to grow pineapples, coffee, tea and sugarcane. There was also an Orangery where citrus fruits were cultivated. In 1799 a catalogue of all the plant species growing at Orford was published by the estate's head gardener. John was High Sheriff of Lancashire in 1743.

John's son was another Thomas and Thomas' son another John (1754–1833), who was High Sheriff for 1781 and MP for Lancashire from 1784 to 1830.

The hall was then leased to Lucy Hornby (whose grandson Edmund Hornby was elected the first MP for Warrington in 1832). When she died her two daughters let the hall for use as a young ladies' school, after which it became the home of the Litton family until 1866.

The next occupant was William Beamont, the first mayor of Warrington, whose widow, Letitia, stayed on at the hall after his death. When she left the property deteriorated until taken over by Warrington Training College.

Ultimately the property descended to Colonel Robert Ireland Blackburne, who in 1916 allowed the hall and 18 acres of surrounding parkland to be gifted to Warrington Council as a War Memorial. The park opened to the public the following year and a bowling green was added in 1924. The house itself, however, was allowed to deteriorate to the point where it was not financially viable to be restored and it was therefore demolished in 1935.
