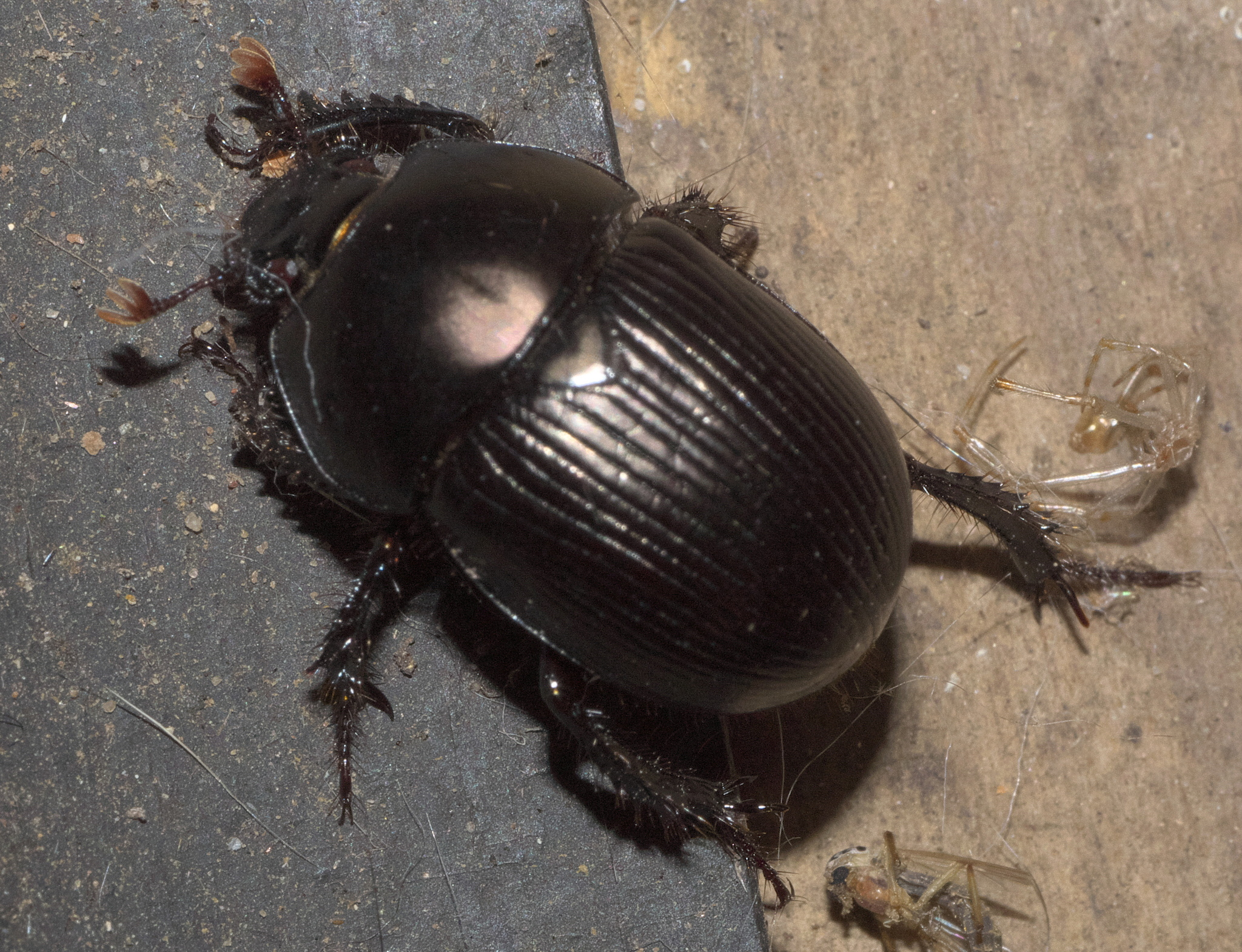
- Geotrupes blackburnii, Oklahoma

Scientific classification
- Kingdom: Animalia
- Phylum: Arthropoda
- Clade: Pancrustacea
- Class: Insecta
- Order: Coleoptera
- Suborder: Polyphaga
- Infraorder: Scarabaeiformia
- Family: Geotrupidae
- Genus: Geotrupes
- Species: G. blackburnii

Binomial name
- Geotrupes blackburnii (Fabricius, 1781)

= Geotrupes blackburnii =

Species of beetle

Geotrupes blackburnii, or Blackburn's earth boring beetle, is a species of earth-boring scarab beetle in the family Geotrupidae.

== Subspecies ==
These two subspecies belong to the species Geotrupes blackburnii:

- Geotrupes blackburnii blackburnii (Fabricius, 1781)
- Geotrupes blackburnii excrementi Say, 1823
