= John Blackburne (1754–1833) =

English landowner

John Blackburne FRS
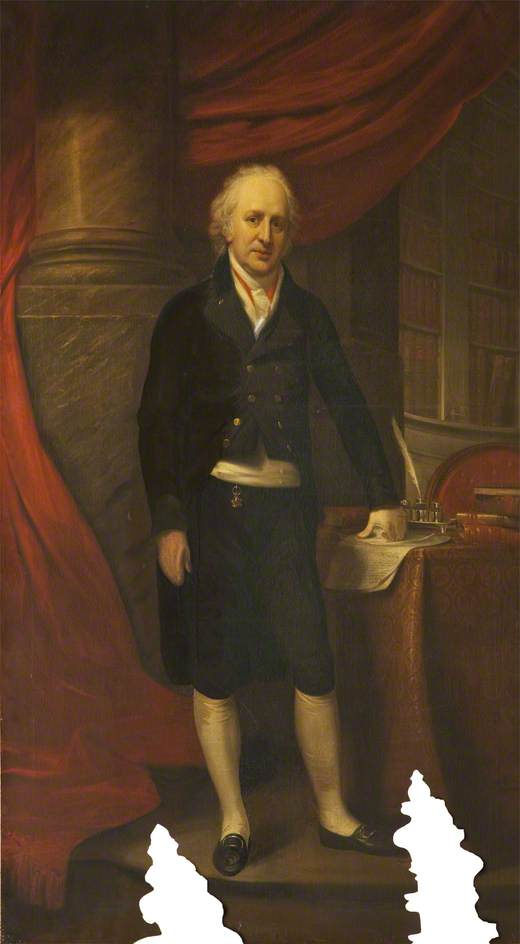
- Blackburne c.1804 by an unknown artist

Member of Parliament for Lancashire
- In office 1784–1830

Personal details
- Born: 5 August 1754
- Died: 11 April 1833 (aged 78)
- Spouse: Anne Rodbard
- Children: 7

John Blackburne (5 August 1754 – 11 April 1833) was an English landowner, Member of Parliament and High Sheriff of Lancashire.

He was born the eldest son of Thomas Blackburne of Hale Hall, Liverpool and educated at Harrow School. He matriculated at Queen's College, Oxford in 1772. He succeeded his father to Hale Hall in 1768 and his grandfather John Blackburne to Orford Hall, Warrington in 1786.

He was appointed High Sheriff of Lancashire for 1781–82 and elected MP for Lancashire in 1784, holding the seat until 1830. In Parliament he was an Independent but generally supported William Pitt. He was elected a Fellow of the Royal Society in 1794.

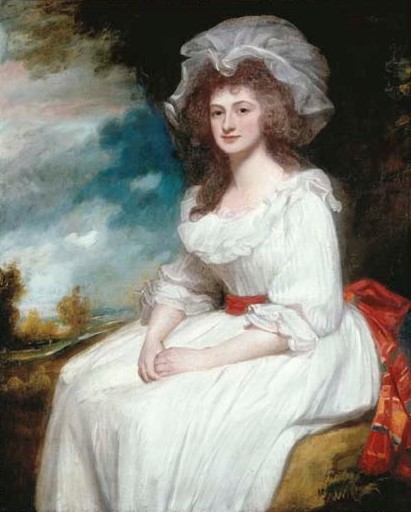
Mrs. Anne Blackburne, painting by George Romney, 1790.

He died in 1833. He had married Anne, the daughter of Samuel Rodbard of Evercreech, Somerset, with whom he had three sons and four daughters.

Parliament of Great Britain
Preceded by Thomas Stanley; Thomas Egerton	Member of Parliament for Lancashire; 1784 – 1800; With: Thomas Stanley	Succeeded by Parliament of the United Kingdom
Parliament of the United Kingdom
Preceded by Parliament of Great Britain	Member of Parliament for Lancashire; 1801 – 1830; With: Thomas Stanley; Lord Stanley	Succeeded by Lord Stanley; John Wilson-Patten
