= Johann Simon von Kerner =

German botanist

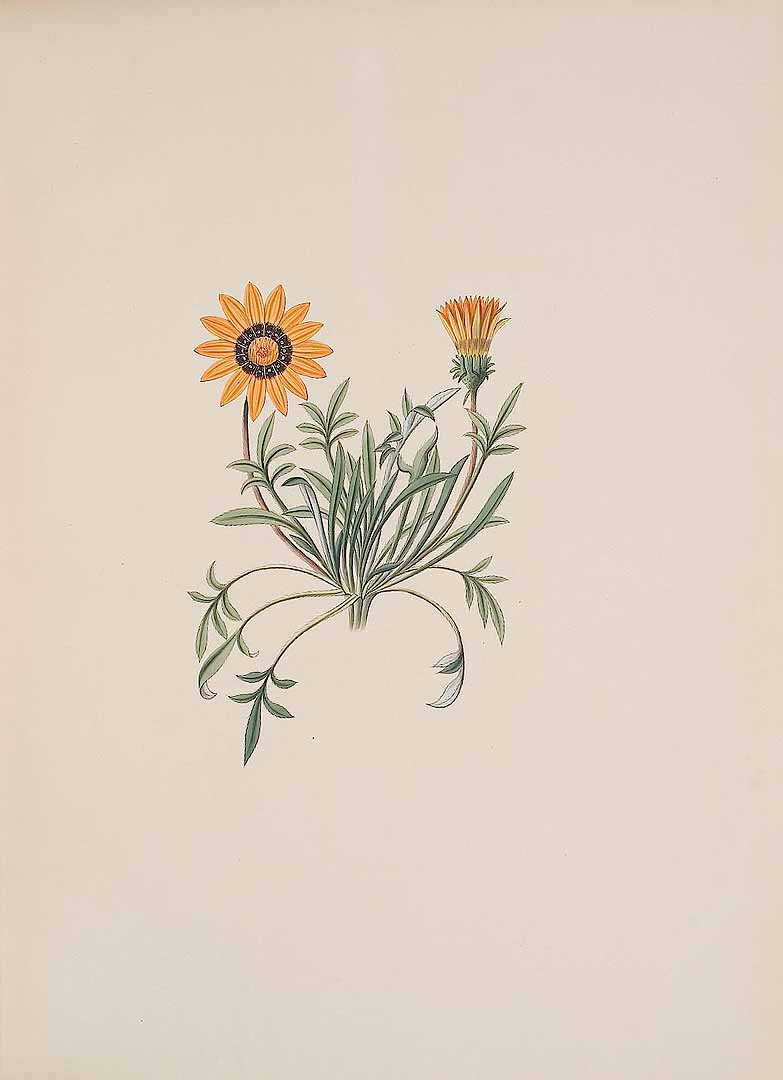
Gazania rigens (L.) Gaertn.

Johann Simon von Kerner (25 February 1755 Kirchheim unter Teck, Baden-Württemberg – 13 June 1830 Stuttgart) was a German botanist and botanical illustrator, notable for his illustrations in Hortus sempervirens. Hortus sempervirens: exhibens icones plantarum selectiorum quotquot ad vivorum exemplorum normam reddere licuit. Stuttgartiae was 12 volumes published between 1795–1830 and issued in 71 fascicles with separate title pages, comprising 12 plates each. Plates accompanied by descriptive letterpress. 851 leaves of plates (some folded).
