= Hamlet Winstanley =

English painter (1698–1756)

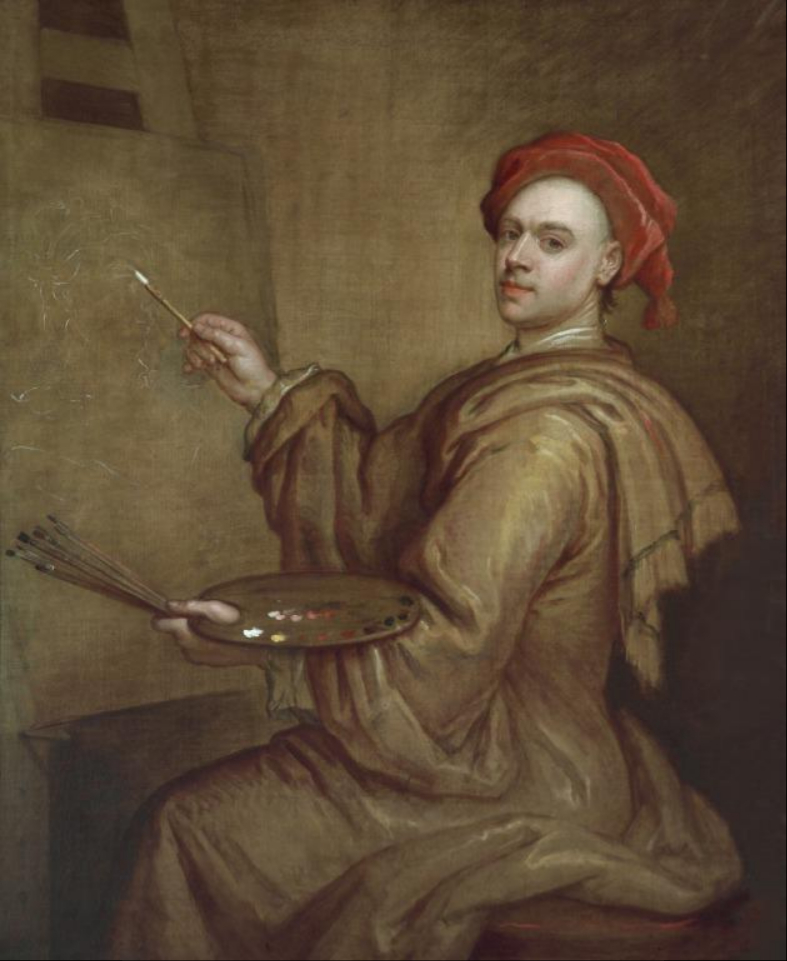
Self-portrait

Hamlet Winstanley (1698–1756) was an English painter, engraver and art agent. As a painter, he was mainly active as a portraitist and copyist.

== Life ==
Winstanley was born in Warrington, Lancashire, the second son of William Winstanley, a tradesman. In 1707 he was placed under the tuition of Samuel Shaw, rector of the parish and master of the Boteler free grammar school. John Finch, rector of Winwick and brother of the Earl of Nottingham, gave him access to his collection of paintings so that he could study and copy them. Finch arranged for him to study in London at the Kneller Academy of Painting and Drawing founded in 1711 in Great Queen Street, Lincoln's Inn Fields. He remained at the academy for three years, receiving tuition from Sir Godfrey Kneller.

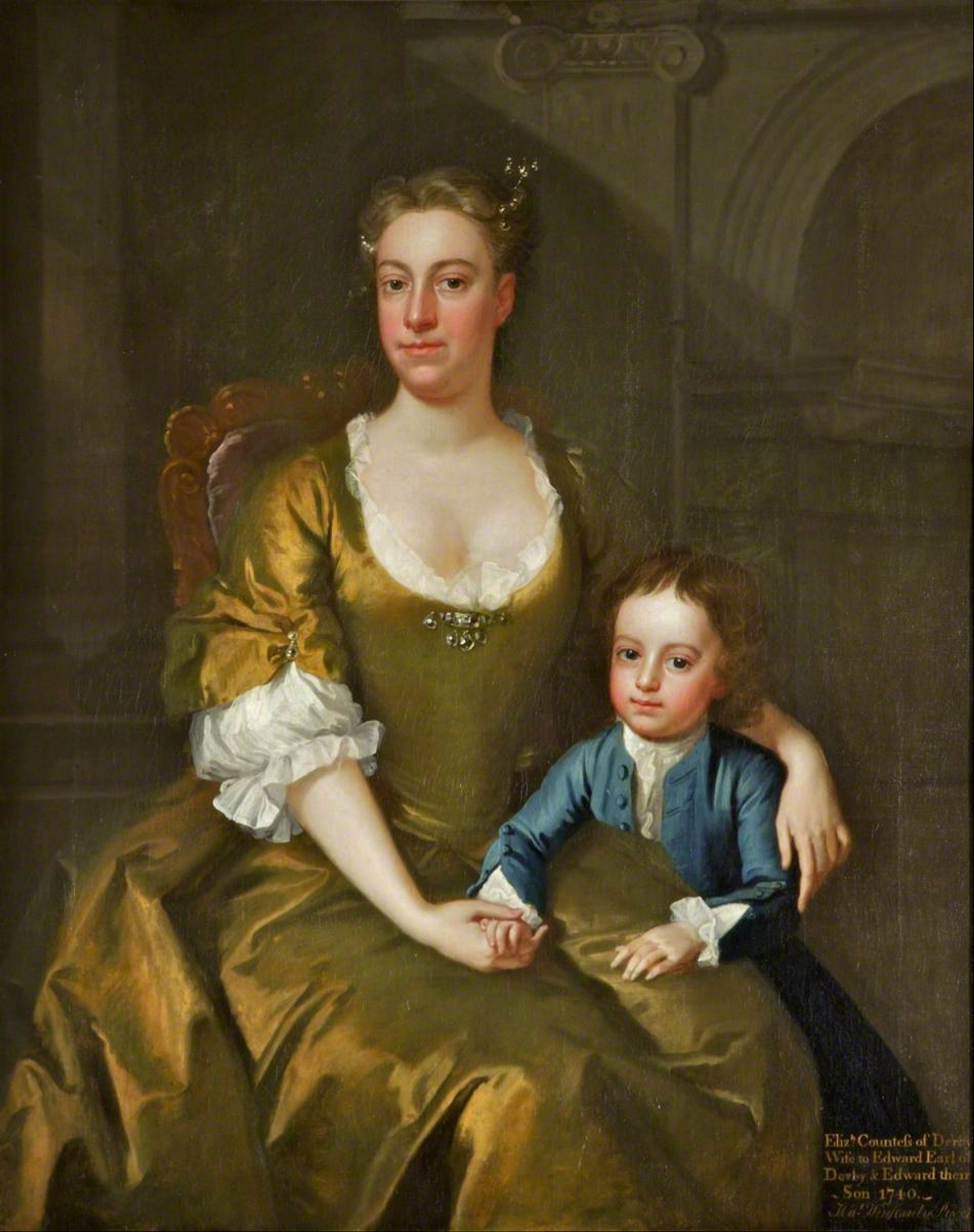
Portrait of Elizabeth, Countess of Derby and Her Son

Winstanley returned to Warrington in 1721 with a commission to paint the portrait of Sir Edward Stanley. Its success led to his introduction to James Stanley, 10th Earl of Derby, and the earl ordered him to come and paint for him at his seat at Knowsley Hall. During the next two years he painted landscapes and portraits, including one of the earl. At the earl's expense, he stayed in Rome from 1723 to 1725. The earl asked him to buy paintings and sculpture, through a certain 'Me. M', a Jacobite exile and collector. Winstanley was thus able to copy various paintings in Roman collections for Lord Derby. After returning to London, Winstanley continued to act as an agent for Lord Derby, bidding and buying on his behalf from auction houses and art dealers.

He spent his later years at Warrington, where he built Stanley Street, and named it after his patrons at Knowsley. He died at Warrington on 18 May 1756. His collections of copper-plates and prints are stated by Horace Walpole to have been sold by auction at Essex House on 18 March 1762.

== Works ==
As a painter, he was mainly active as a portraitist and copyist. Winstanley left sketches of Rome and studies of antique figures. The British Museum purchased two examples of his pen and wash drawings in 1870. The Yale Centre for British Art holds a sketchbook containing 81 study drawings of body parts by Hamlet Winstanley. He executed large copies of the Three Graces by Raphael, in the Farnesina Palace at Rome, and of the Triumph of Bacchus by Annibale Caracci, in the Farnese Palace. His etchings after pictures by old masters (including Ribera, Rembrandt, Anthony van Dyck, Carlo Dolci, Tintoretto, Titian, Rubens, Frans Snyders, and Salvator Rosa) in the possession of the Earl of Derby were bound together in a portfolio known as the Knowsley Gallery.

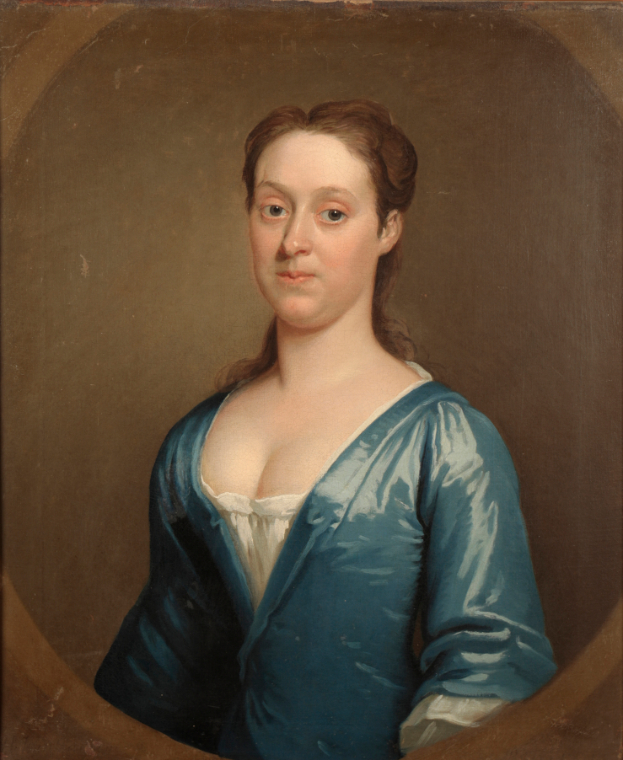
Portrait of a young lady

Winstanley executed portraits of the Stanleys, John Blackburne of Orford Hall, Samuel Peploe, and Jonathan Patten of Manchester. Several of his portraits were etched or engraved. He would often paint the head on a separate piece of canvas and then send it to the drapery painter Joseph Van Aken in London so it could be pasted onto the costumed figure to be painted by Van Aken. The portrait of the Earl of Derby was engraved by Gerard Van der Gucht and the portrait of Edward Waddington, painted in 1730, was engraved in mezzotint by John Faber the Younger. Some of his landscape and other subjects were at Knowsley Hall.

Winstanley also made etchings of Sir James Thornhill's paintings in the dome of St Paul's Cathedral. He also made a series of large etchings after old master paintings in the collection of the 19th Earl of Derby at Knowsley Hall in c.1728-9.
