= James Cook Collection: Australian Museum =

James Cook Collection
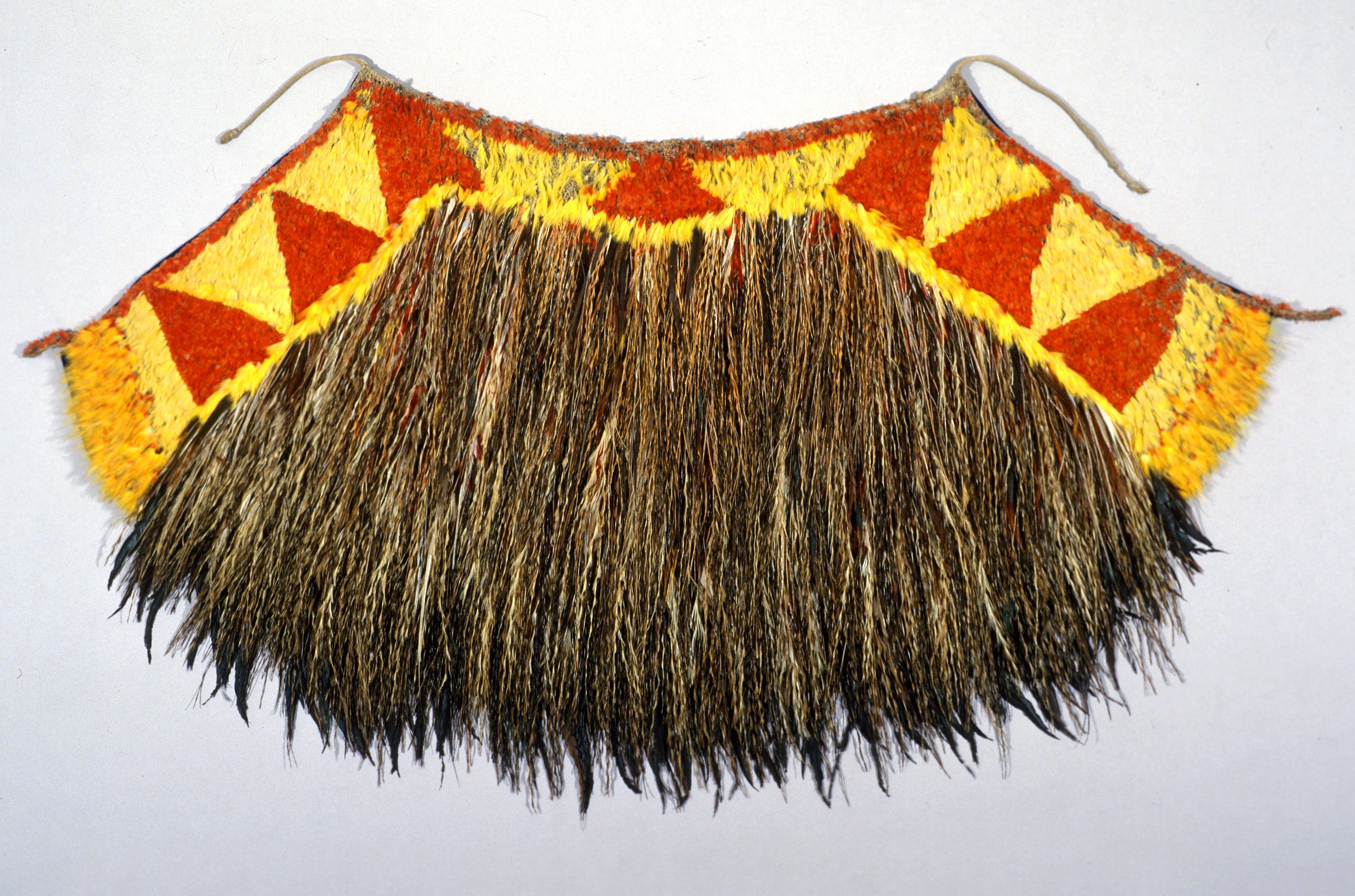
- H000104- Feather Cape
- Held by: The Australian Museum
- Location: Sydney, New South Wales Australia

Provenance
- Origin: Greater Pacific
- Source: Captain James Cook
- Collected: c.1768- c.1780
- Website: Official website

The Australian Museum's Cook Collection was acquired in 1894 when it was transferred from the Government of New South Wales. At that time it consisted of 115 artifacts collected on Captain James Cook's three voyages of discovery Throughout the Pacific Ocean, during the period 1768–1780, along with documents and memorabilia related to these voyages. Many of the ethnographic artifacts were collected at a time of first contact between Pacific Peoples and Europeans. In 1935 most of the documents and memorabilia were transferred to the Mitchell Library in the State Library of New South Wales. The provenance of the collection shows that the objects remained in the hands of Captain James Cook's widow, Elizabeth Cook and her descendants until 1886. In this year John Mackrell, the great nephew of Isaac Smith, Elizabeth Cook's cousin, organized the display of this collection at the request of the NSW Government at the Colonial and Indian Exhibition in London. In 1887 the London-based Agent-General for the New South Wales Government, Saul Samuel, bought John Mackrell's items and also acquired those items belonging to the other relatives Reverend Canon Frederick Bennett, Mrs Thomas Langton, H.M.C. Alexander and William Adams. The collection remained with the Colonial Secretary of NSW until 1894, when it was transferred to the Australian Museum.

== James Cook ==
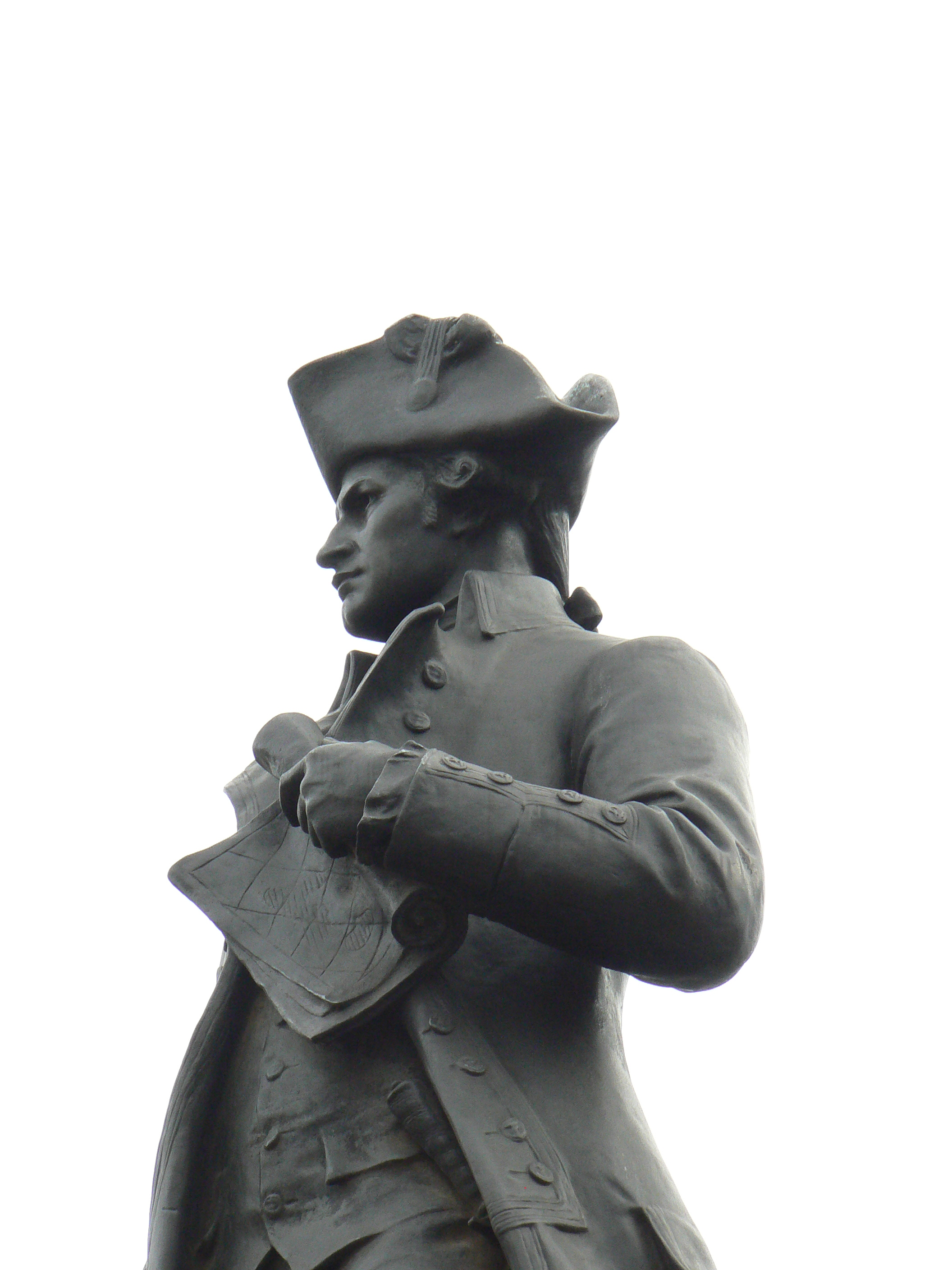
Statue of Captain James Cook at Admiralty Arch, London

Captain James Cook, FRS, RN (7 November 1728 (Note: Old style date: 27 October) – 14 February 1779) was a British explorer, navigator and cartographer who ultimately rose to the rank of captain in the Royal Navy. Cook made detailed maps of Newfoundland prior to making three voyages to the Pacific Ocean, during which he achieved the first European contact with the eastern coastline of Australia and the Hawaiian Islands, as well as the first recorded circumnavigation of New Zealand.

Cook joined the British merchant navy as a teenager and joined the Royal Navy in 1755. He saw action in the Seven Years' War, and subsequently surveyed and mapped much of the entrance to the Saint Lawrence River during the siege of Quebec. This helped bring Cook to the attention of the Admiralty and Royal Society. This notice came at a crucial moment in both Cook's career and the direction of British overseas exploration, and led to his commission in 1768 as commander of HM Bark Endeavour for the first of three Pacific voyages.

In three voyages Cook sailed thousands of miles across largely uncharted areas of the globe. He mapped lands from New Zealand to Hawaii in the Pacific Ocean in greater detail and on a scale not previously achieved. As he progressed on his voyages of discovery he surveyed and named features, and recorded islands and coastlines on European maps for the first time. He displayed a combination of seamanship, superior surveying and cartographic skills, physical courage and an ability to lead men in adverse conditions.

Cook was killed in Hawaii in a fight with Hawaiians during his third exploratory voyage in the Pacific in 1779. He left a legacy of scientific and geographical knowledge which was to influence his successors well into the 20th century and numerous memorials worldwide have been dedicated to him. However, his role in opening areas of the Pacific to colonisation and its subsequent effects on indigenous peoples have been the subject of both political and scholarly debate.

== Provenance ==
=== Hawaii ===
Captain Cook first visited the Hawaiian Islands on 18 January 1778 on his third voyage, and his ships spent three months there, mostly anchored off Kauai and Hawaii. Cook considered them his most important discovery for England, and named the group the Sandwich Islands after his patron Lord Sandwich, First Lord of the Admiralty.

The objects acquired reflect the fact that the Hawaiians initially treated Cook as a god and presented him with high status goods such as feathered capes, hats, ornaments and images. As this was a point of first contact between Europeans and Hawaiians, a thriving trade developed, and a large number of artefacts, mostly those that were carried or worn, were brought back to England. Hawaiian collections from Cook's voyages show in particular the extent and variation of Hawaiian featherwork at the time.

Cook's ships returned to Hawaii nearly a year later after exploring the northwest coast of America, Alaska and Northeast Asia. They spent a few weeks without incident and departed only to return due to a problem with the ship. On 14 February 1779, Cook was killed on Hawaii due to an unfortunate misunderstanding.

The artifacts in the Australian Museum's Cook collection attributed to Hawaii include a feathered cloak, four feathered circlet ornaments, a foundation mat for a feather cloak, a woven cane helmet, a nose whistle, a shark's tooth ring, three miniature bone carved turtles, a shark's tooth knife and more than 20 cut pieces of barkcloth.

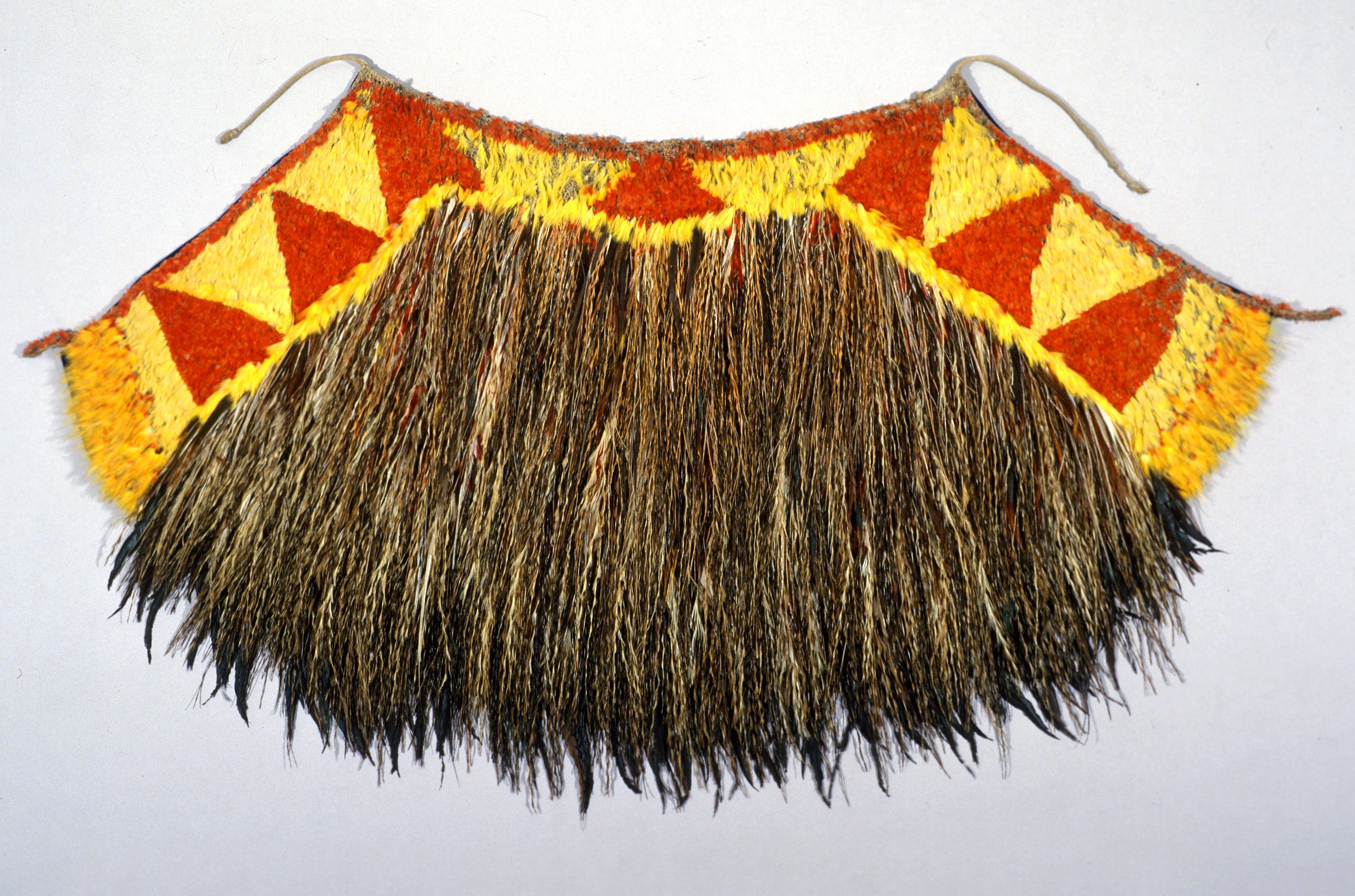
H000104- Feather cloak (ʻahuʻula)

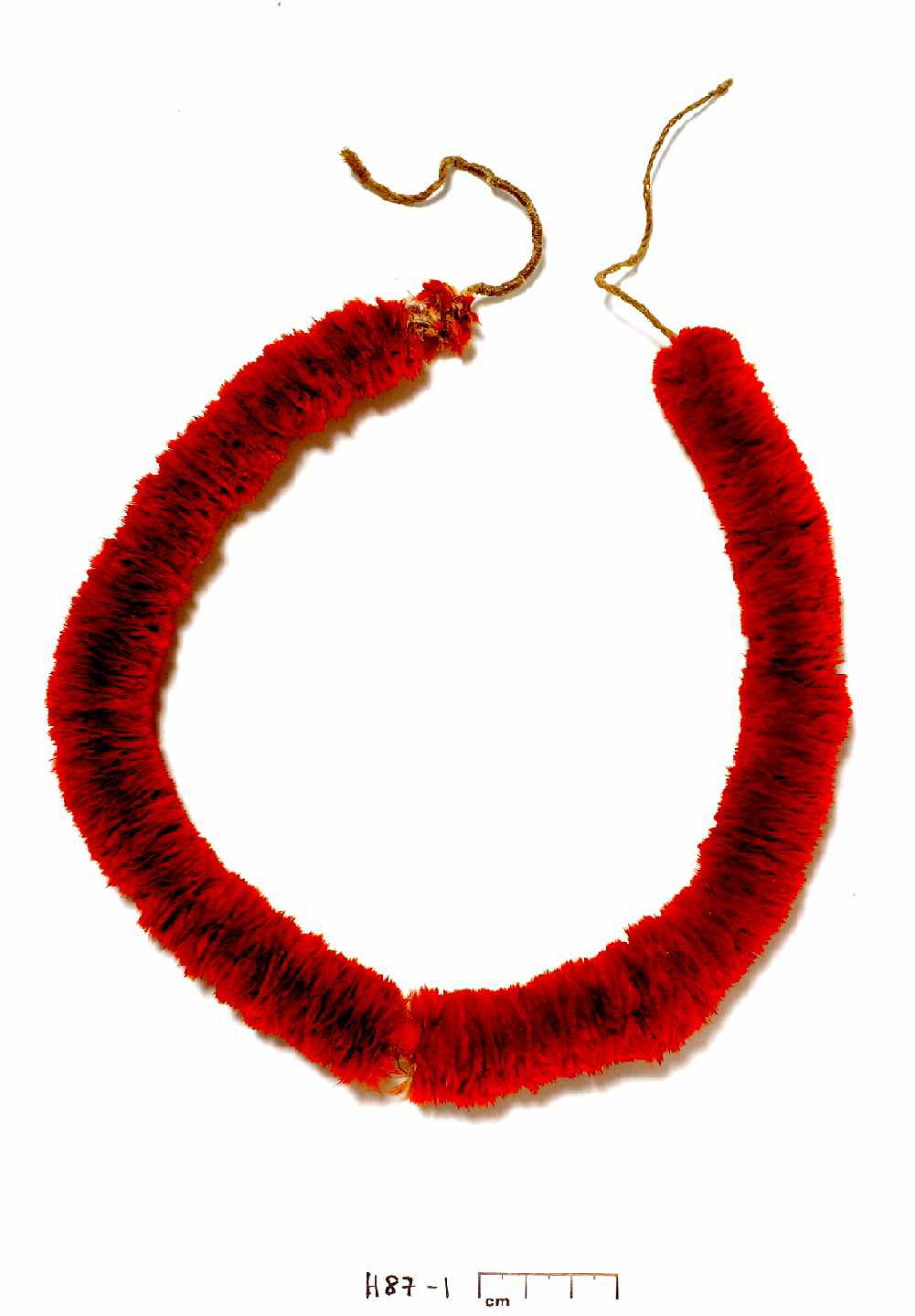
H000087- Lei

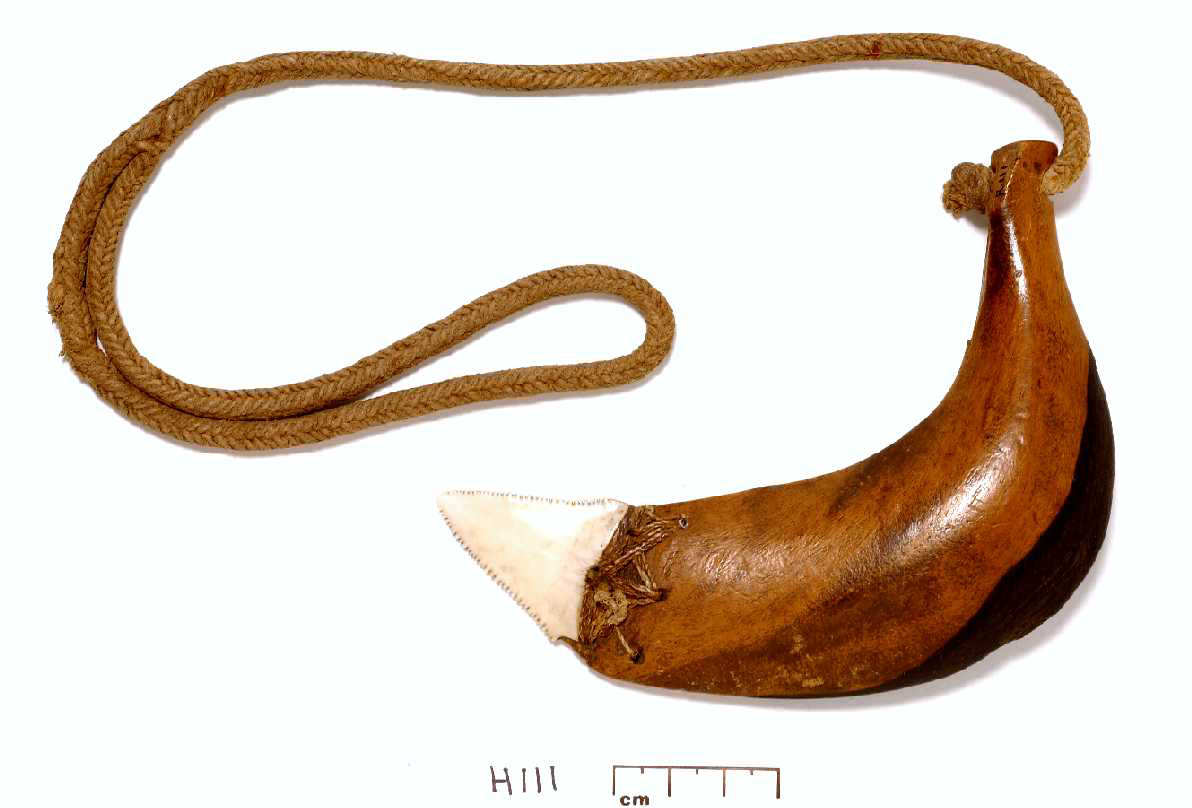
H000111- Shark's tooth knife

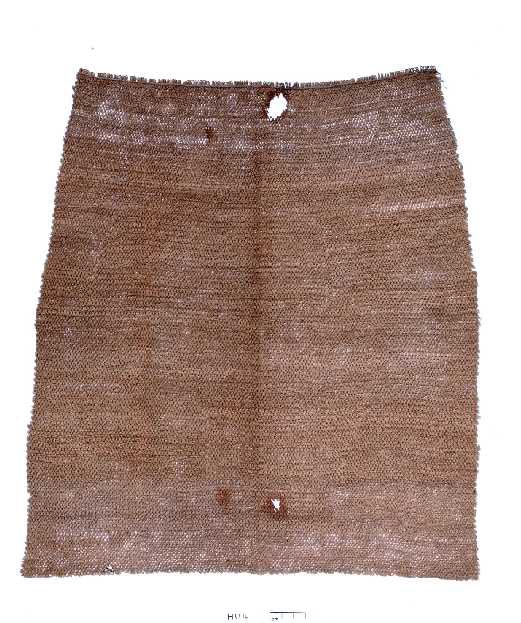
H000114- Netting for feather cloak

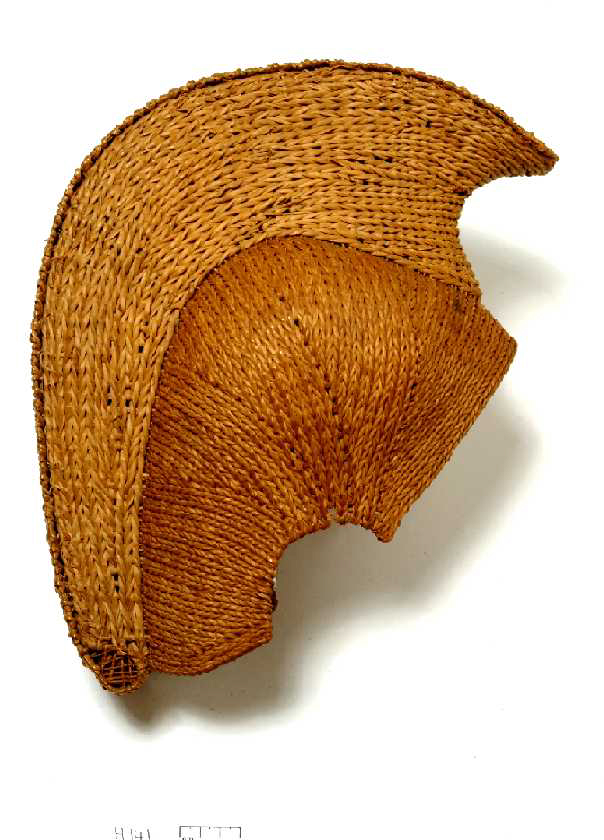
H000141- Wicker helmet (mahiole)

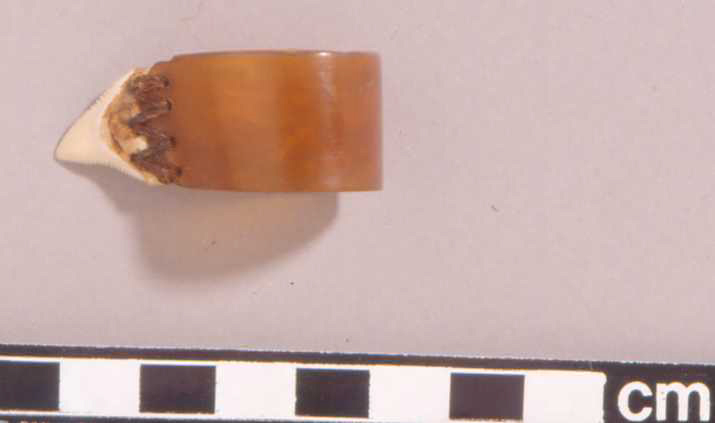
H000150- Shark's tooth ring

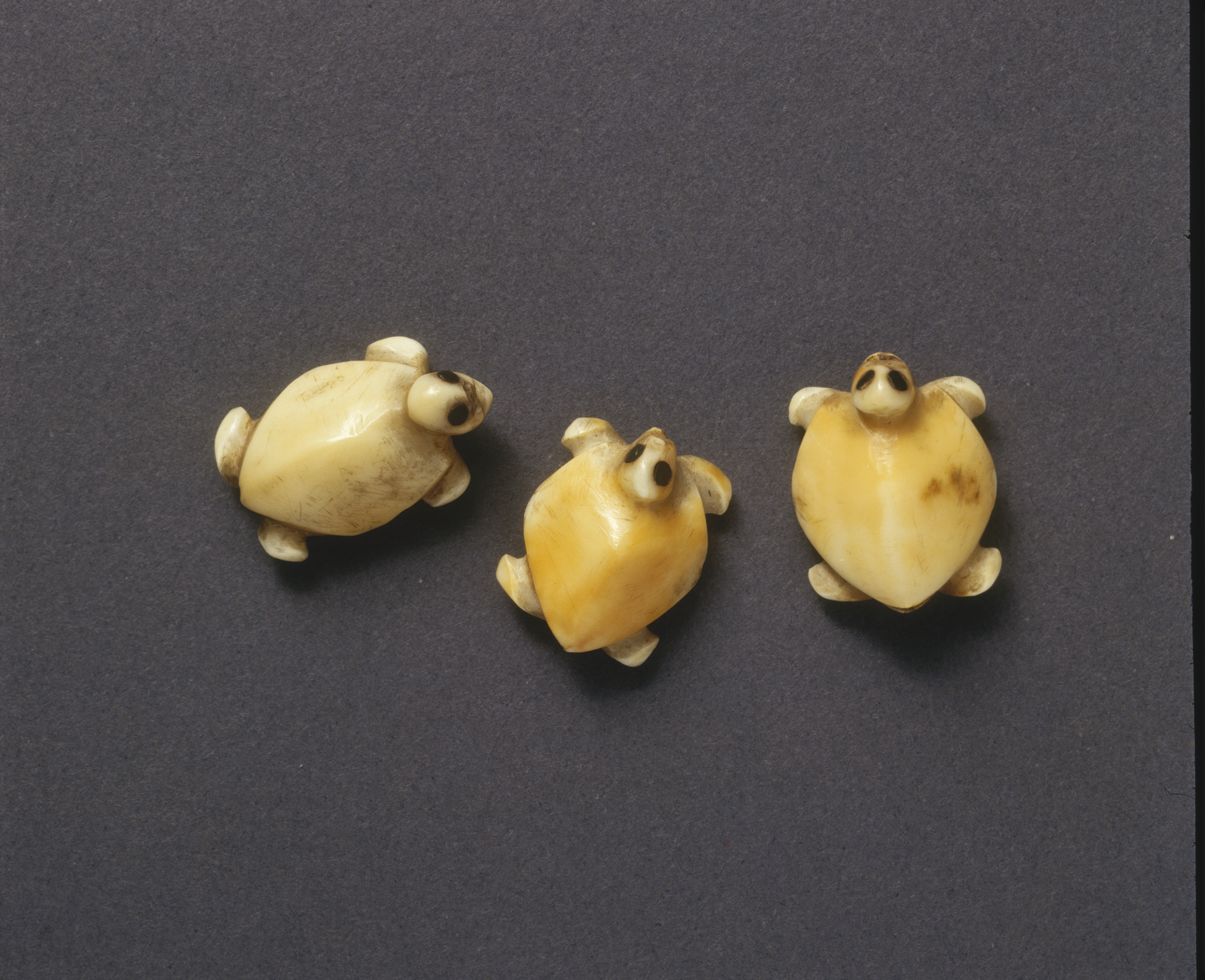
H000151-001- Carved turtle figures

=== American north west coast ===
Cook's ships left Hawaii on 2 February 1778 and set course for North America, which they sighted on 7 March. On 29 March they discovered Nootka Sound. The area had been claimed by the Spanish under Juan José Pérez Hernández, 1774 and the English by Sir Francis Drake, 1579. Cook named the area King George Sound. The Resolution and Discovery spent about one month in the area while the ships were repaired and made ready for the expedition to find the northwest passage.

A great deal of trading was done and the largest number of objects collected from the NorthWest Coast is from Nootka Sound. Objects from other groups may have been collected in Nootka. Wooden Combs were characteristic and several were collected (see H000110).

The next stop was Prince William Sound and Cook Inlet. The ethnographic specimens collected are very mixed and include Tlingit people and Athabaskan. Cook noted that none of the people lived in the bay where they had anchored. Containers of various kinds were made of mountain sheep horn. They appear to be Athabaskan in style (see H000056).

In Unalaska or the Aleutian Islands Samwell recorded that the crew traded cloth from Hawaii and Tahiti with the locals for arrows and other articles. Only a few objects can be traced to the voyages of Cook. Small ivory birds, possibly gaming pieces, were probably collected in Unalaska (see H000151). A large number of weapons and fishing and hunting implements, as well as a few paddles and canoe models, were collected in the northern parts of America and Asia and are hard to provenance (see H000106 and H00122 and H000139).

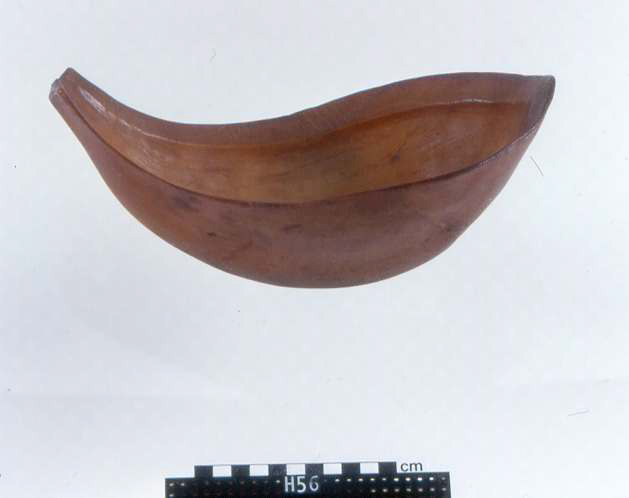
H000056-Scoop

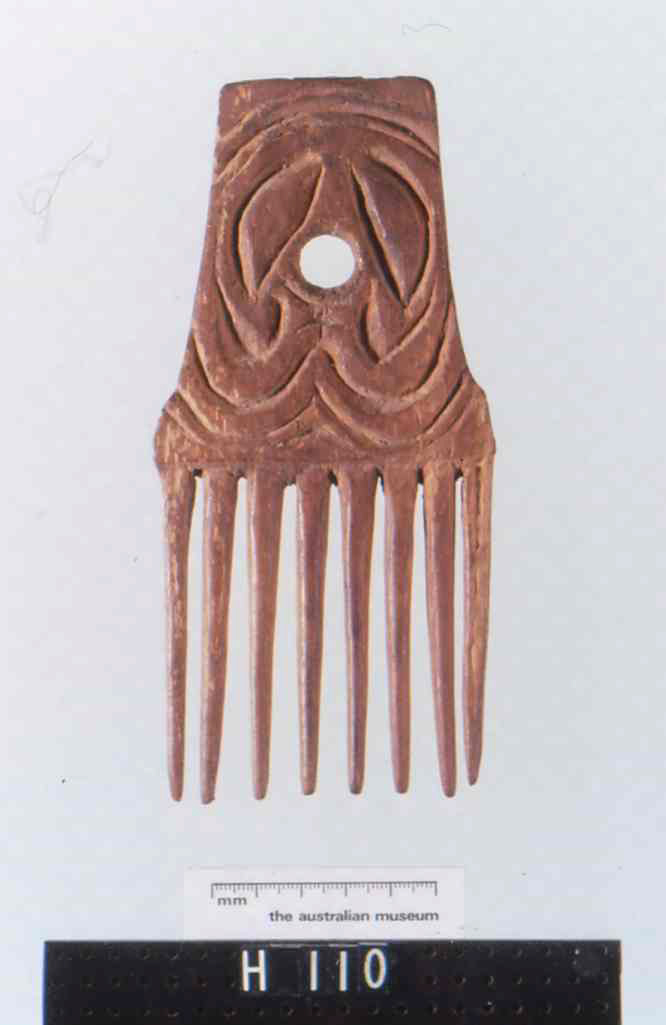
H000110- Comb

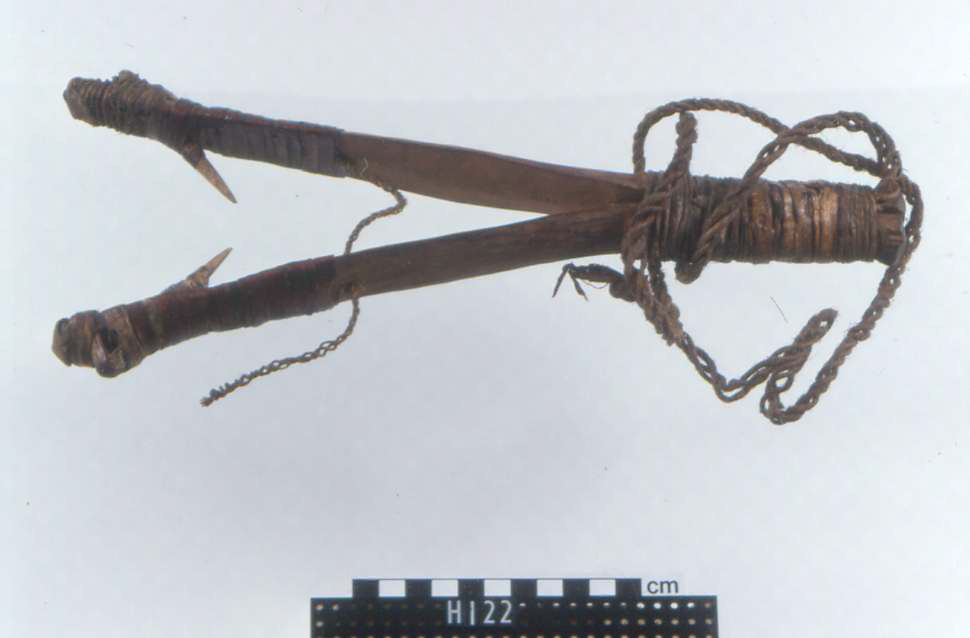
H000122- Fish hook

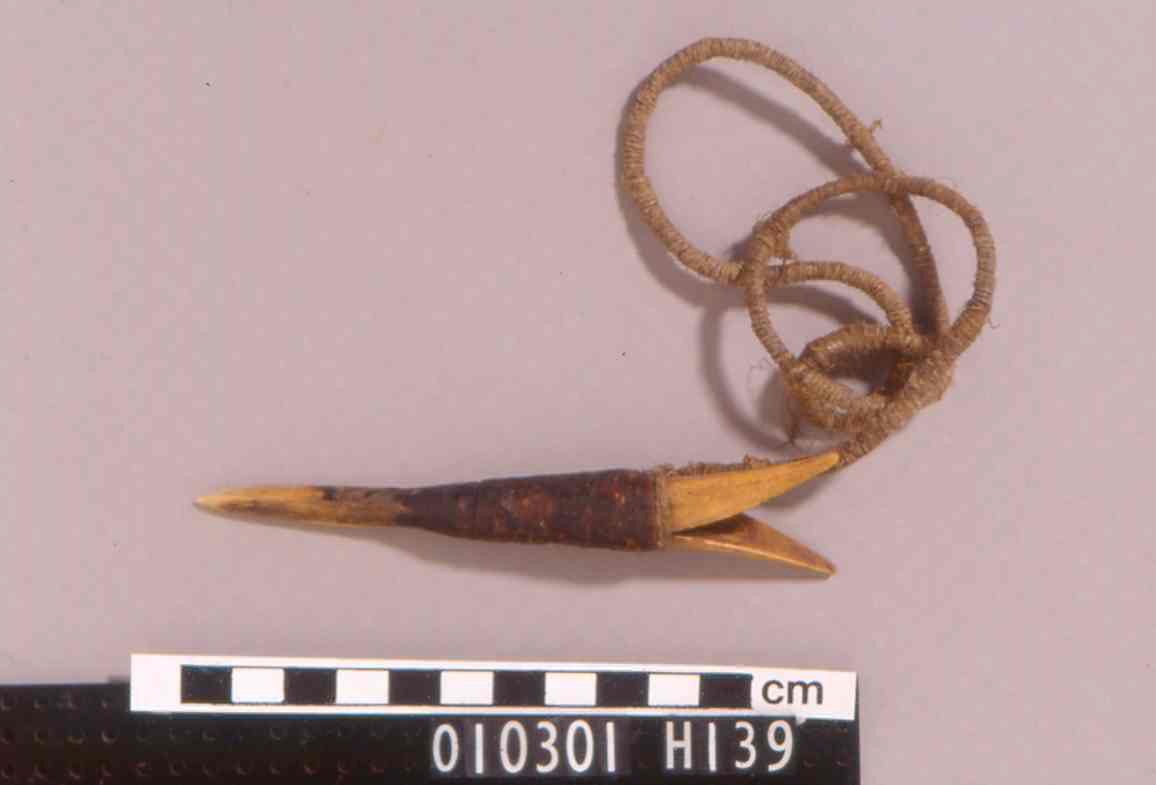
H000139- Bone harpoon

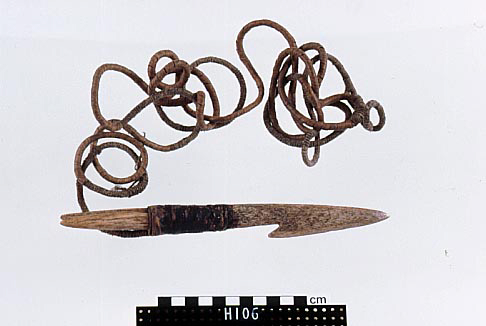
H000106- Harpoon

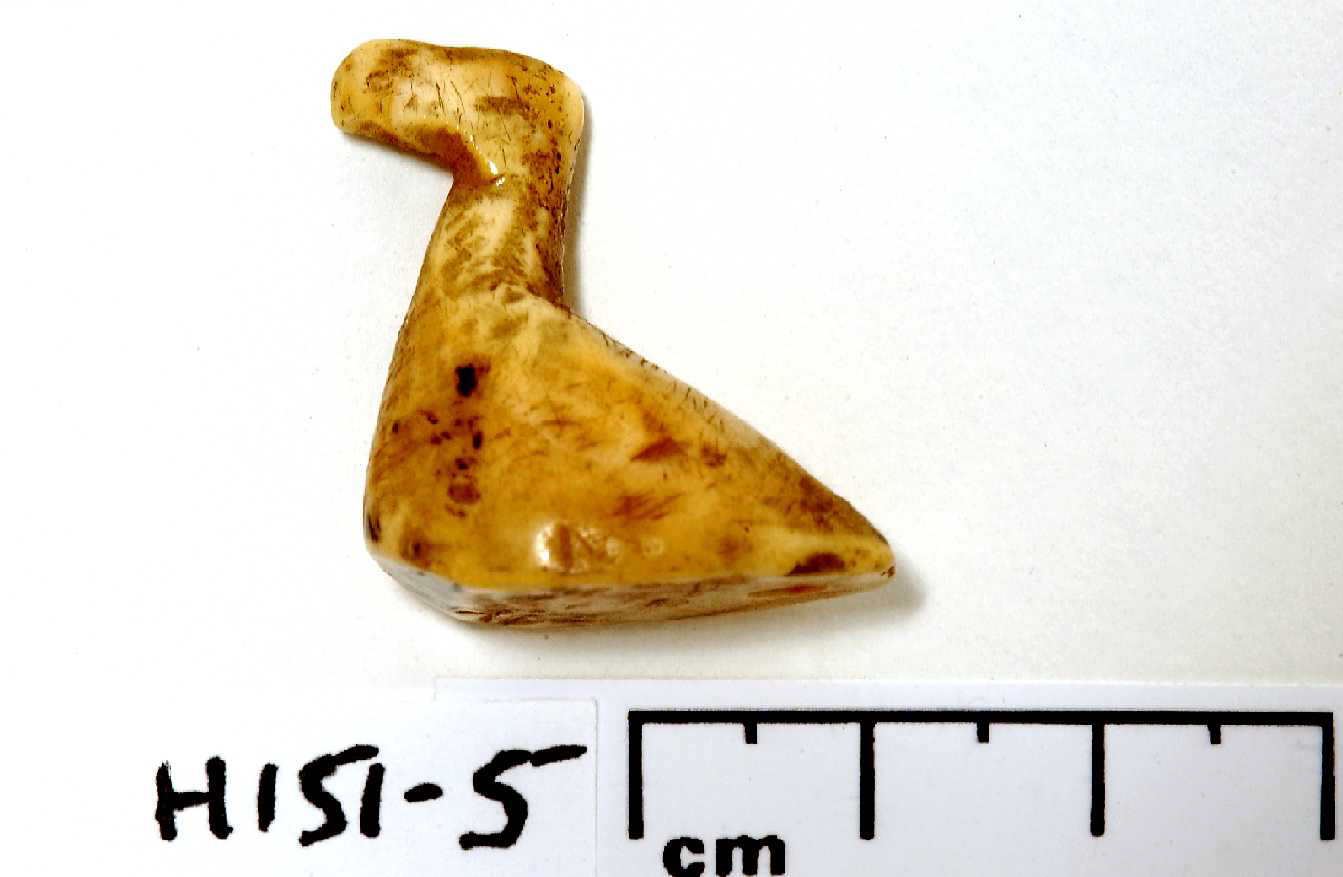
H000151- Harpoon head

=== New Caledonia ===
Cook visited New Caledonia for two weeks during his second voyage in 1774. Eight days were spent in the Balad area, where Cook participated in a ritual exchange of gifts. Not many artefacts were collected, and most of these were weapons, which the local people were happy to sell to the visitors. New Caledonian hardwood clubs were finely carved and highly polished. (H000147, H000148) Hodges depicts a spearthrower being worn as an ornament to a hat. The Australian Museum's collection includes 3 spearthrowers (one ornamented: H000119). 3 knitted bags for slingstones were collected and the Australian Museum holds one of these (H000115). The Australian Museum's collection also includes 2 combs (H000108, H000109).

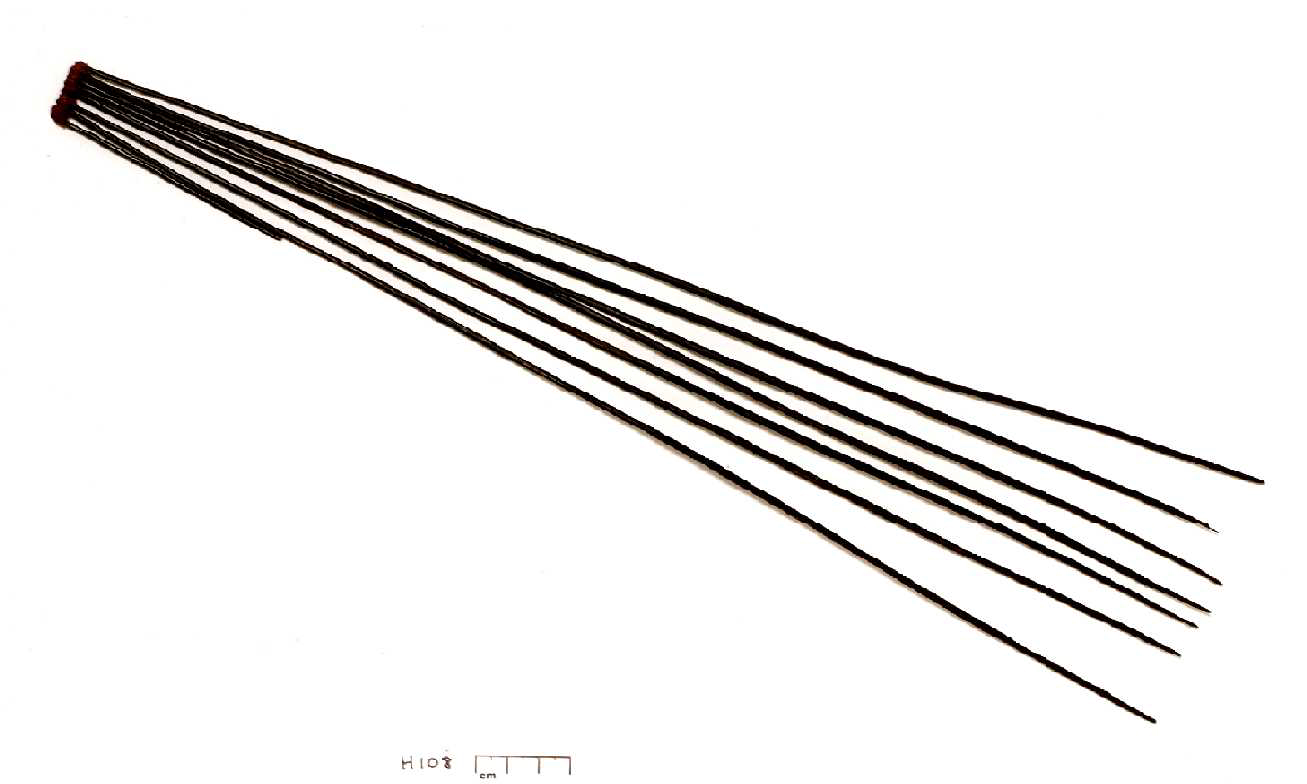
H000108- Comb of quills

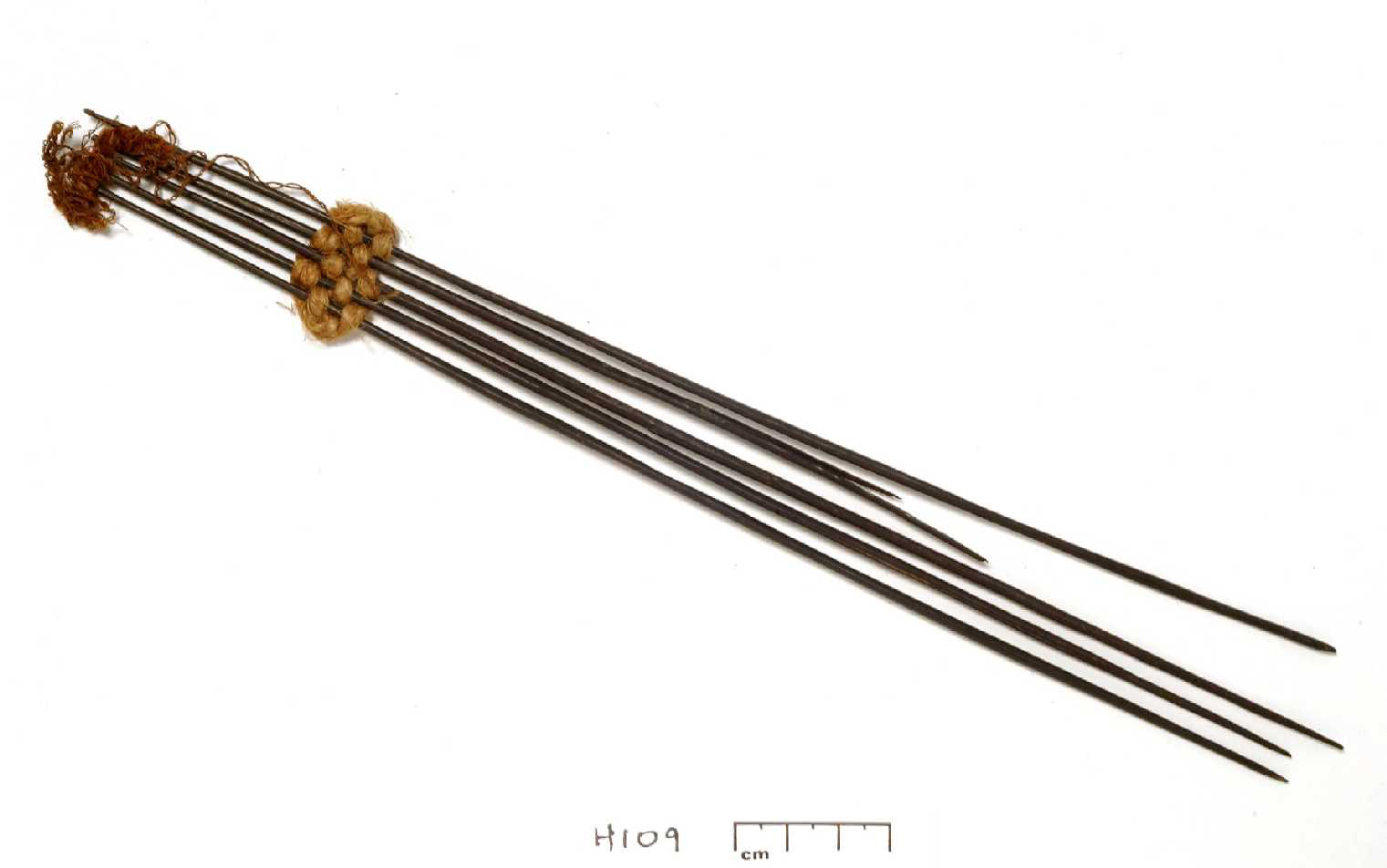
H000109- Comb of quills

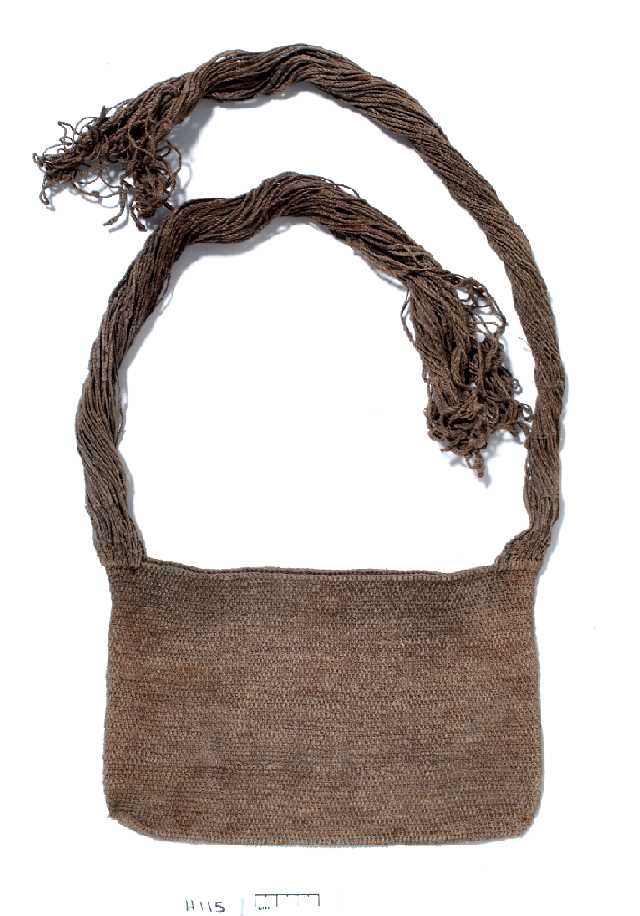
H000115-Knitted Bark String Bag

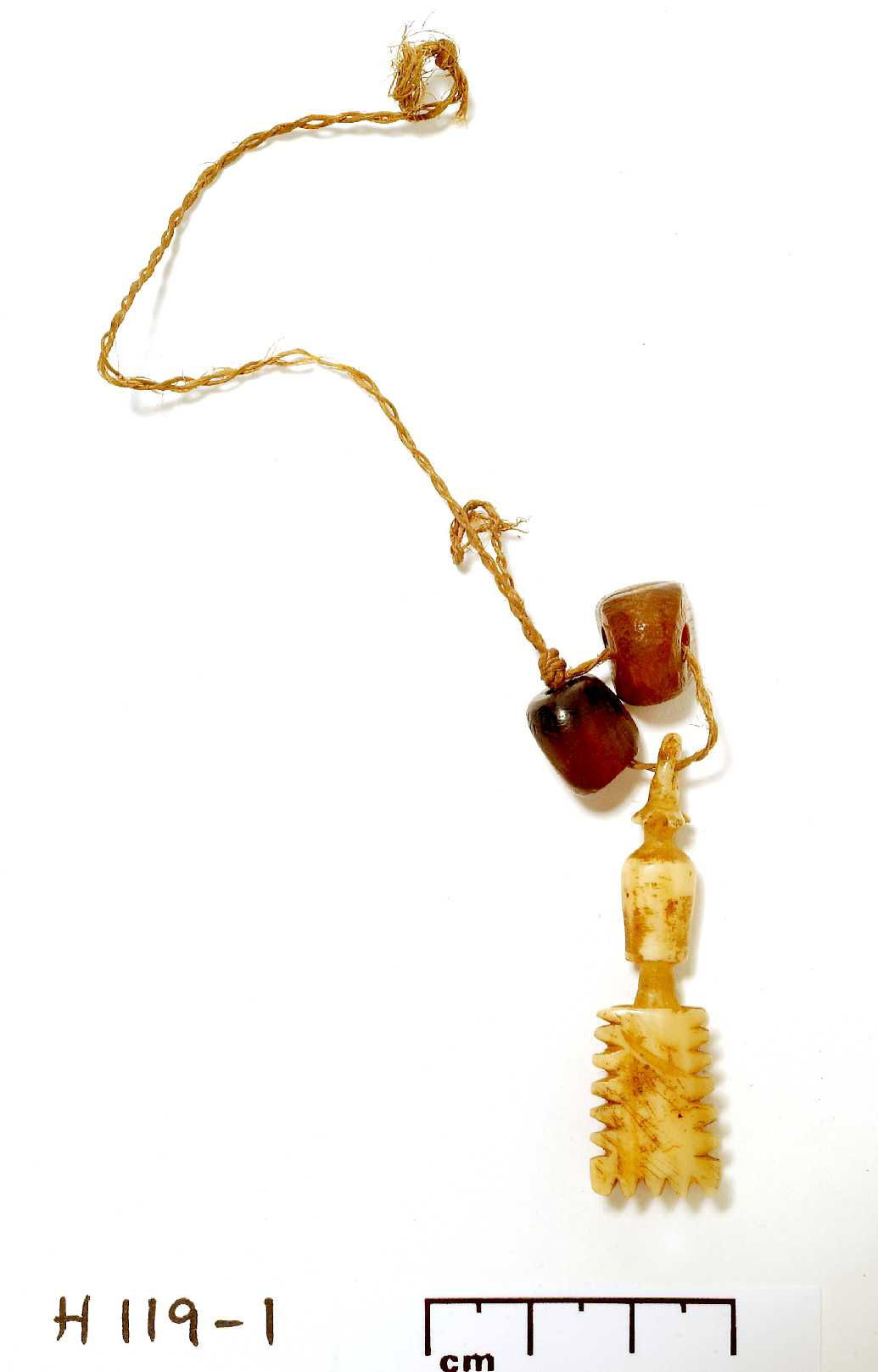
H000119-Carved Ornament

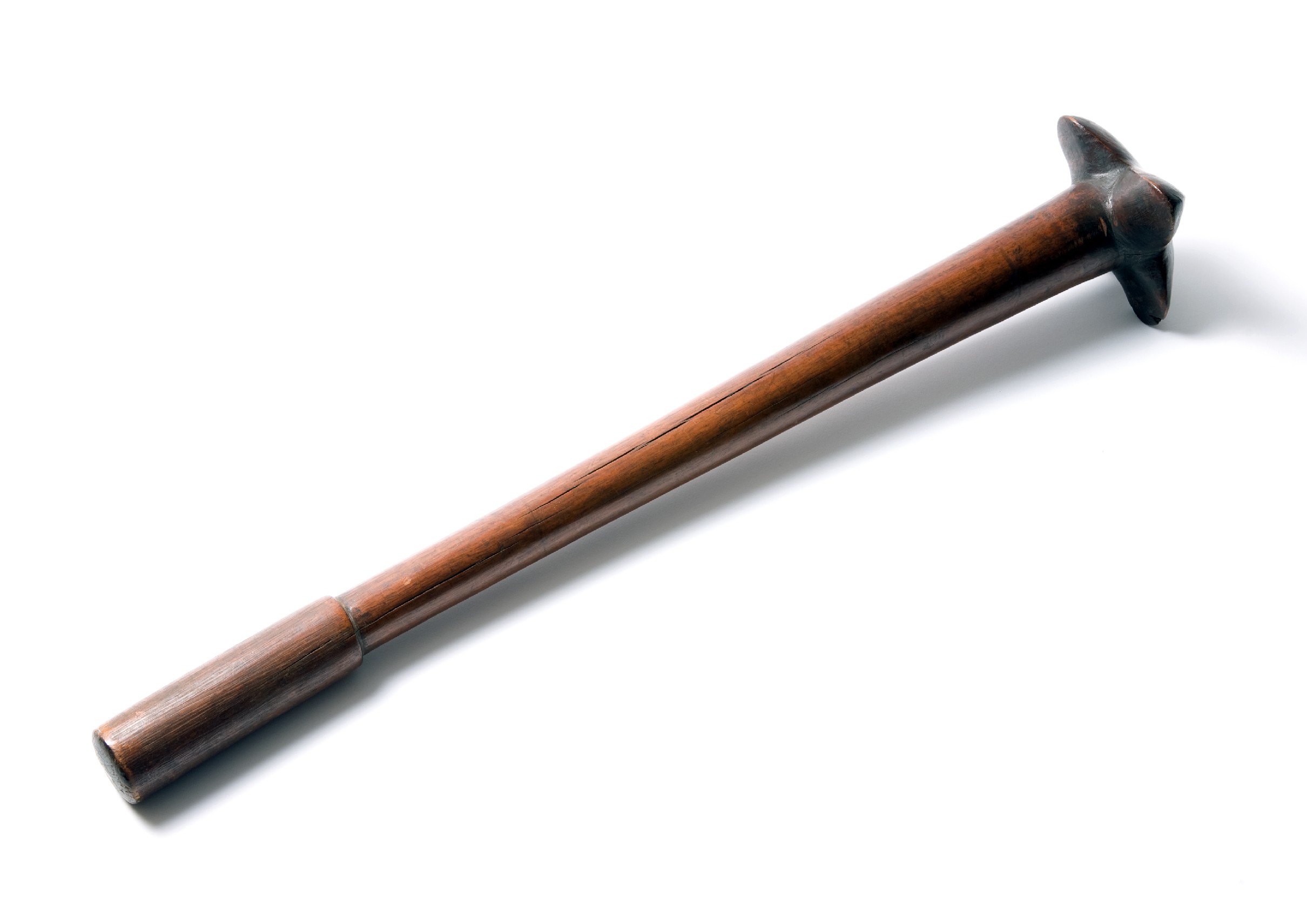
H000147- Wooden club

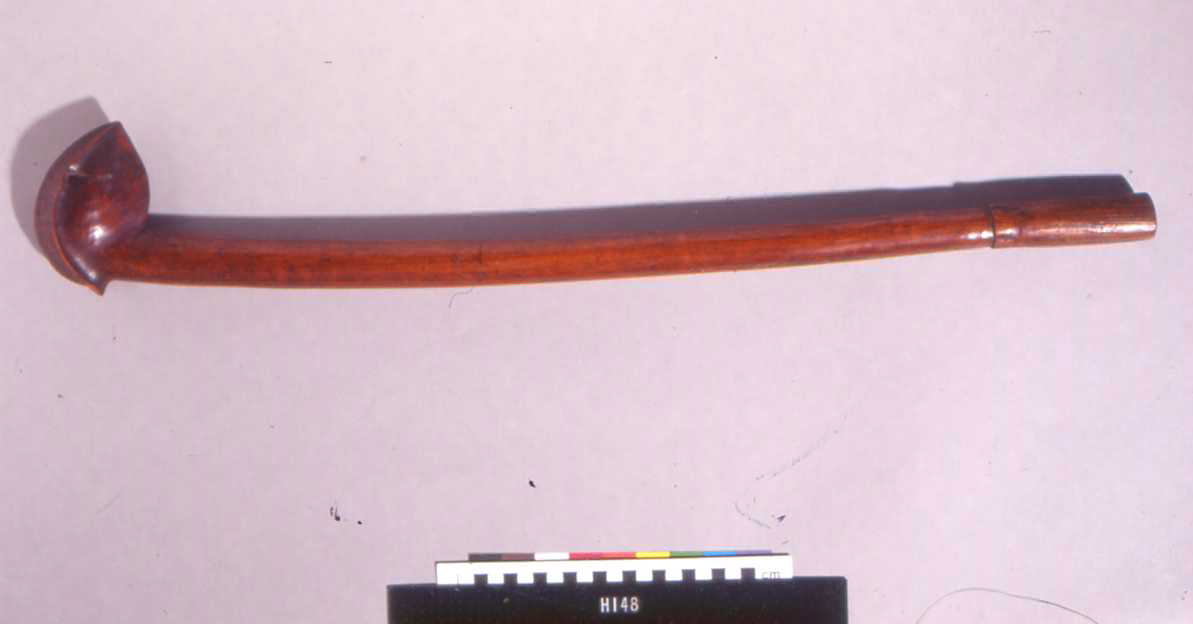
H000148- Wooden club

=== New Zealand ===
The only known European contact with New Zealand prior to Cook's voyages was a short and hostile interaction when Abel Tasman visited Golden Bay on the north west tip of the South Island in 1642. On 8 October 1769 HMS Endeavour, after 2 months at sea, anchored in a bay on the eastern side of the North Island. This was a case of first contact, and Cook and his crew did not succeed in peaceful interactions with the local Māori group, so the ship left the area with Cook naming it Poverty Bay. However the Endeavour went on to circumnavigate both the North and South Islands and there was contact with many different Māori groups and exchanges of goods were made.

New Zealand was visited by French ships in 1769 and 1772, and Cook's ships returned on both the 2nd (1773) and third (1777) voyages. Kaeppler suggests that the availability of iron tools and the influence of European ideas and desires for certain goods may have stimulated changes in artefact production over the period of interactions.

As this AM collection came via Cook's widow and is therefore probably personal to Cook himself, it cannot be identified to a specific voyage, area or date. Kaeppler documents the types of artefacts collected from New Zealand during Cook's voyages. Over 40 cloaks were collected (H000103), a large number of body ornaments (H000222, H000156, H000063), feather boxes and musical instruments. Many weapons of nearly every type were collected, but this Cook collection has only one of these, a stone patu (H000085). There are 3 stone adze blades (H000082,83,84) and two fish hooks (H000137, H000138). Kaeppler notes that food preparation equipment was seldom collected, perhaps because exchanges happened away from the villages, and between men.

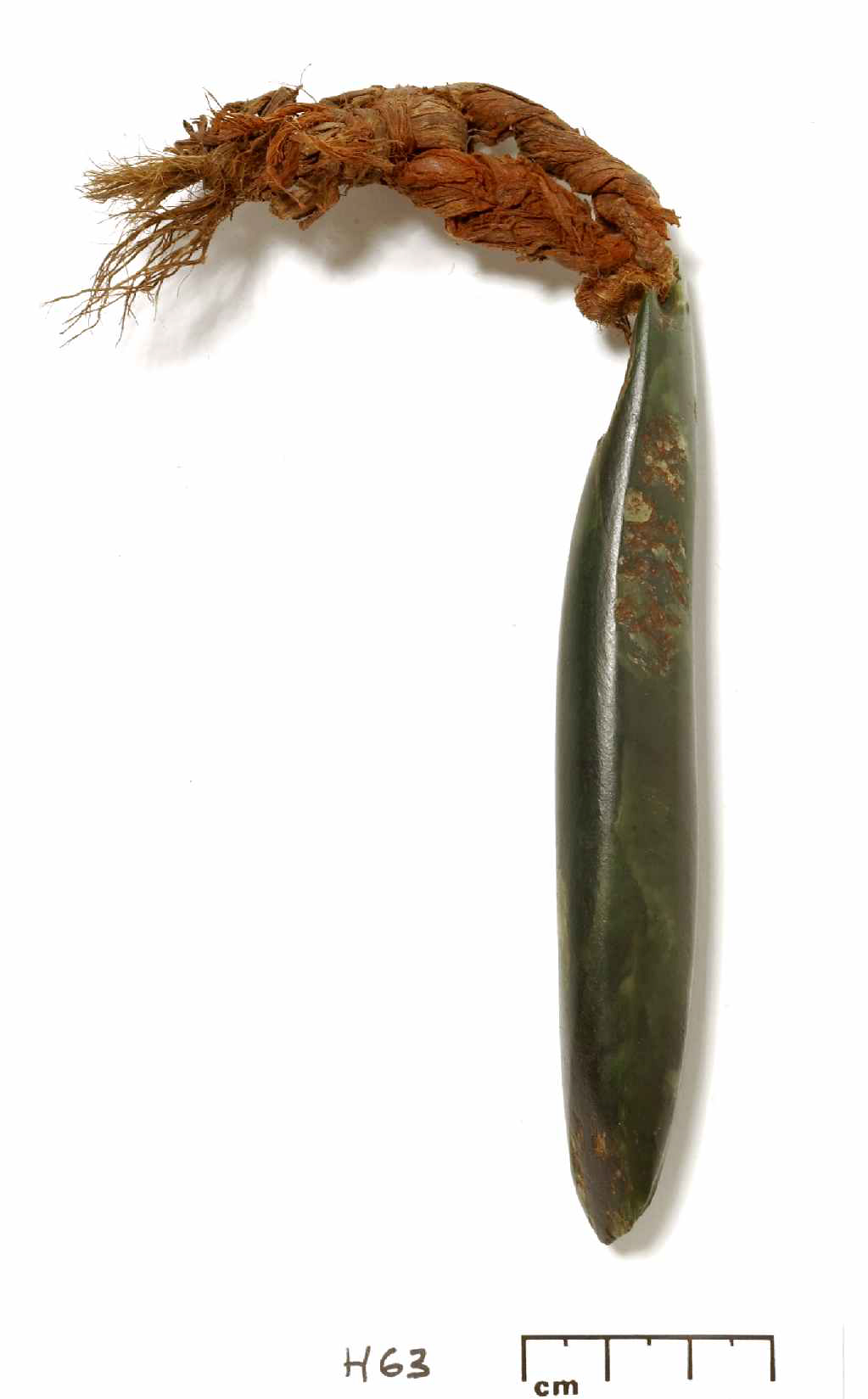
H000063- Ear ornament or Kuru

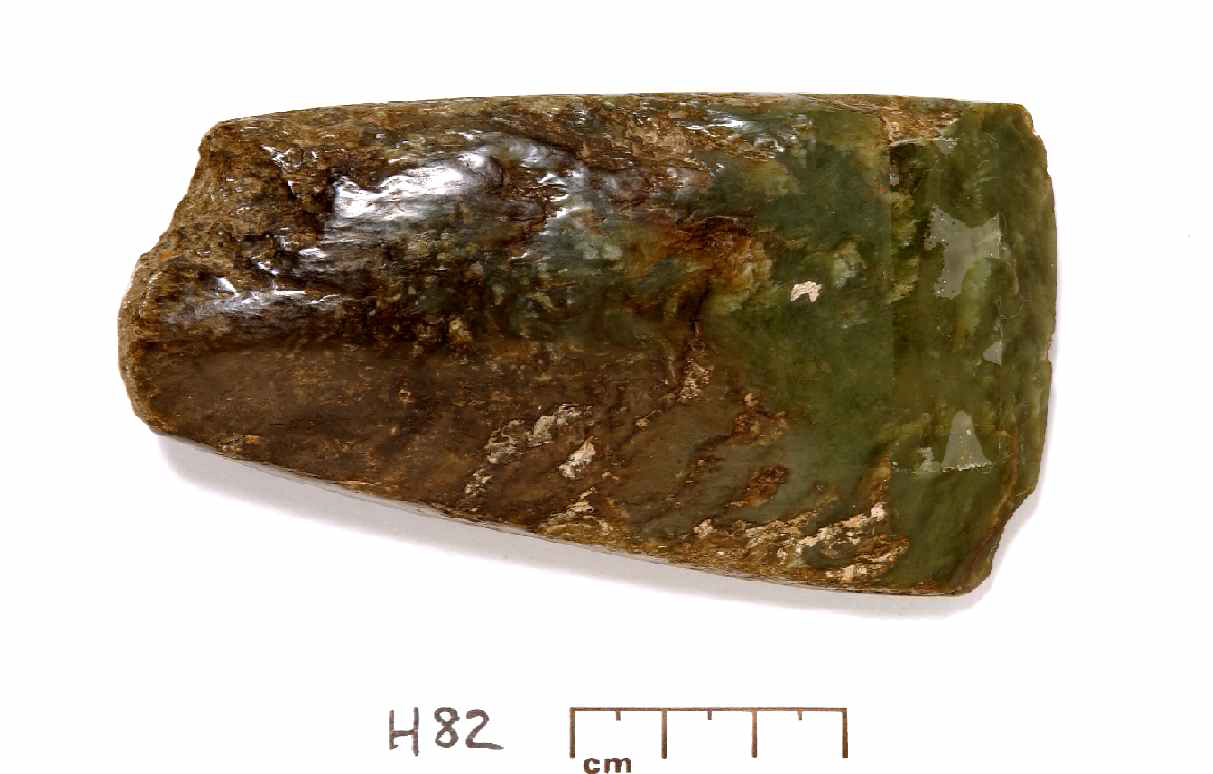
H000082- Adze blade

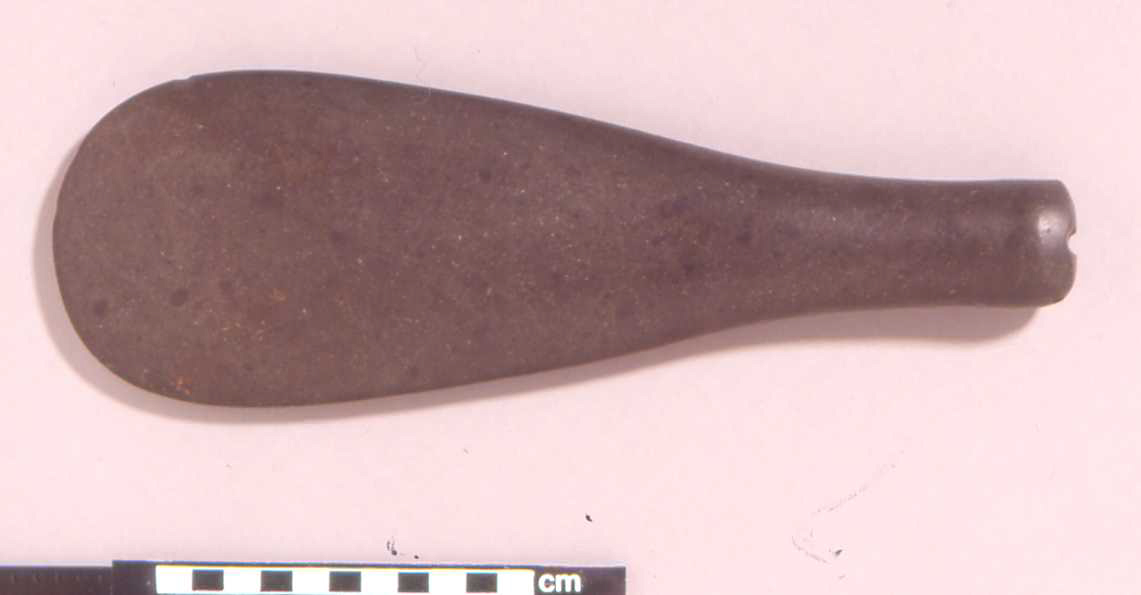
H000085- Stone club or patu onewa

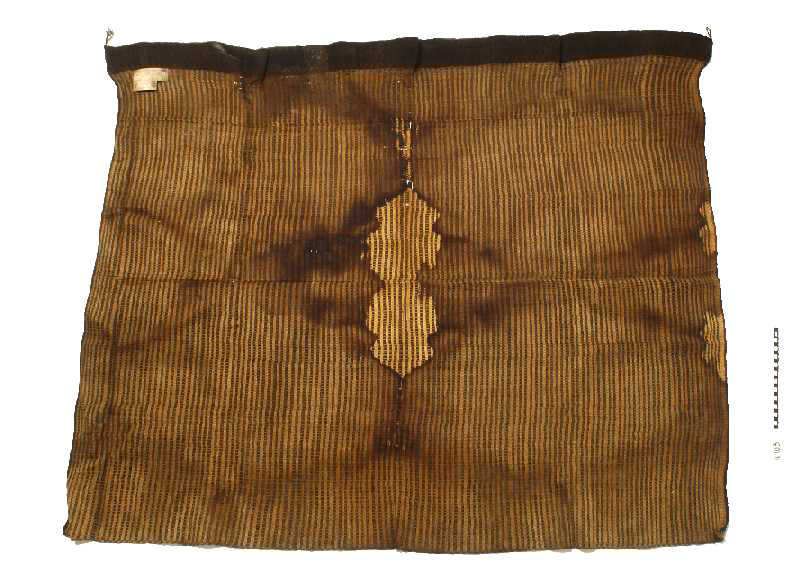
H000103- Cloak of dyed flax

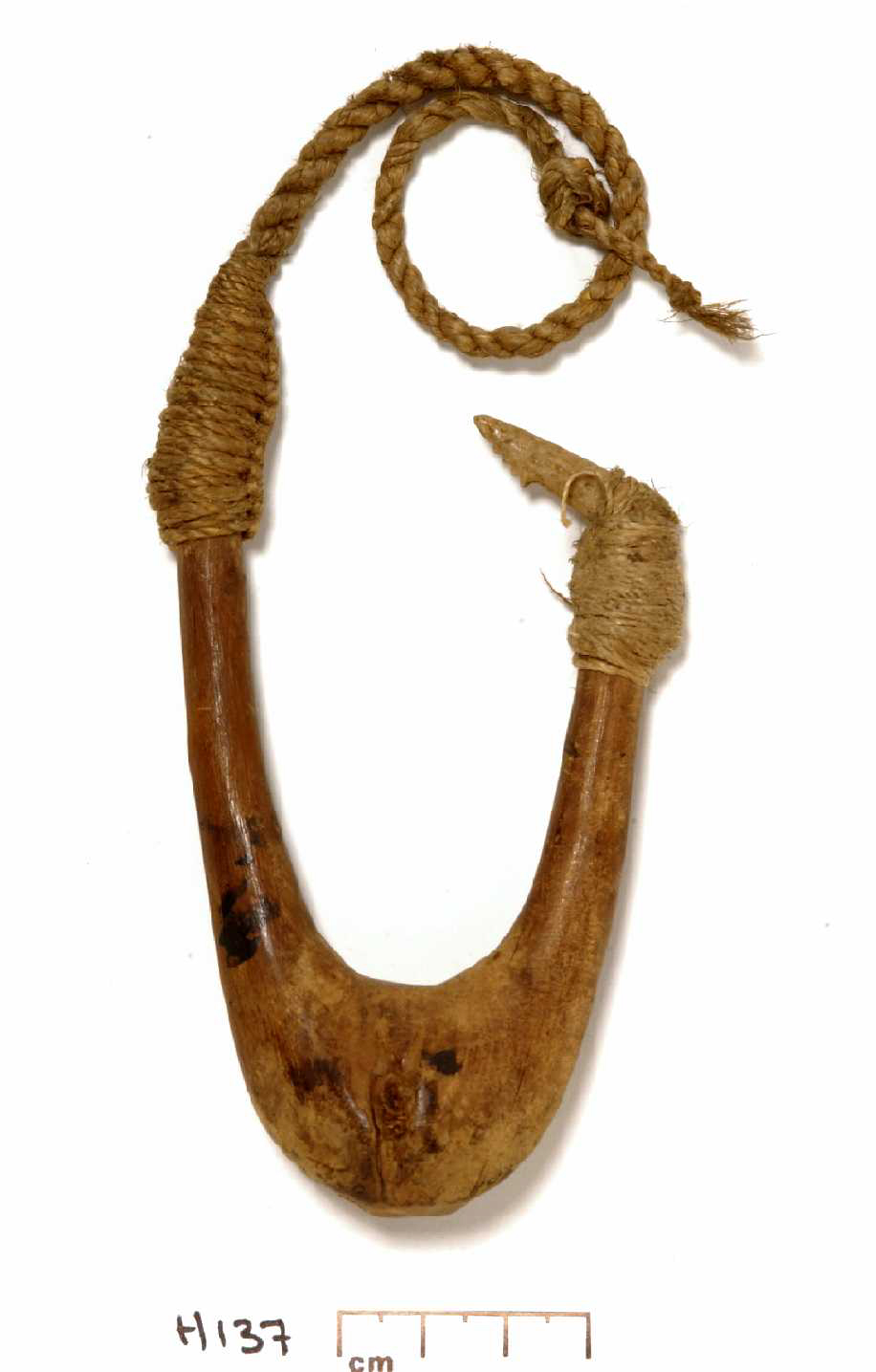
H000137- Fish hook

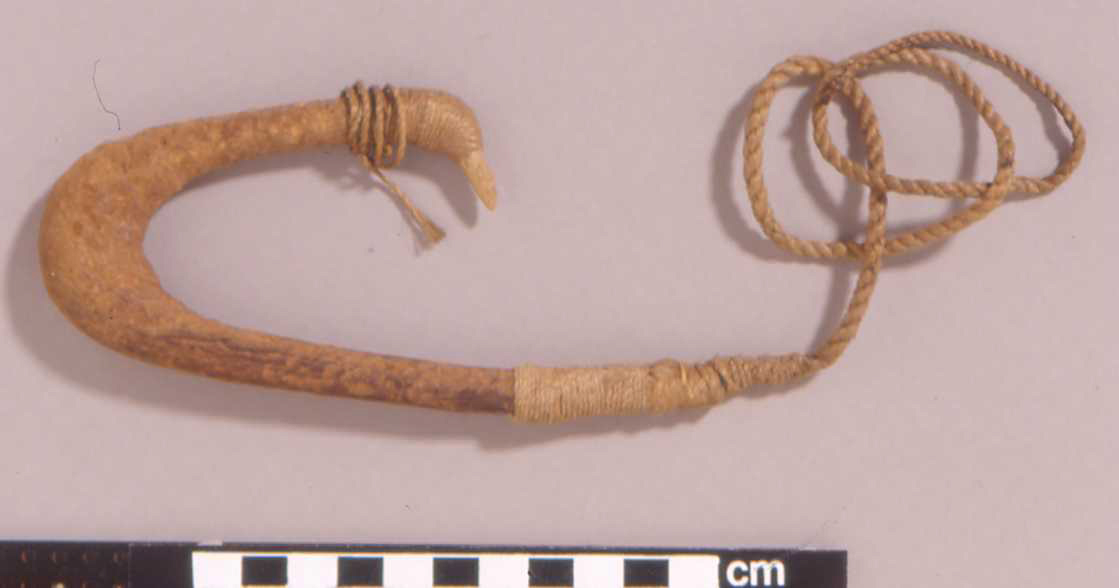
H000138- Fish hook

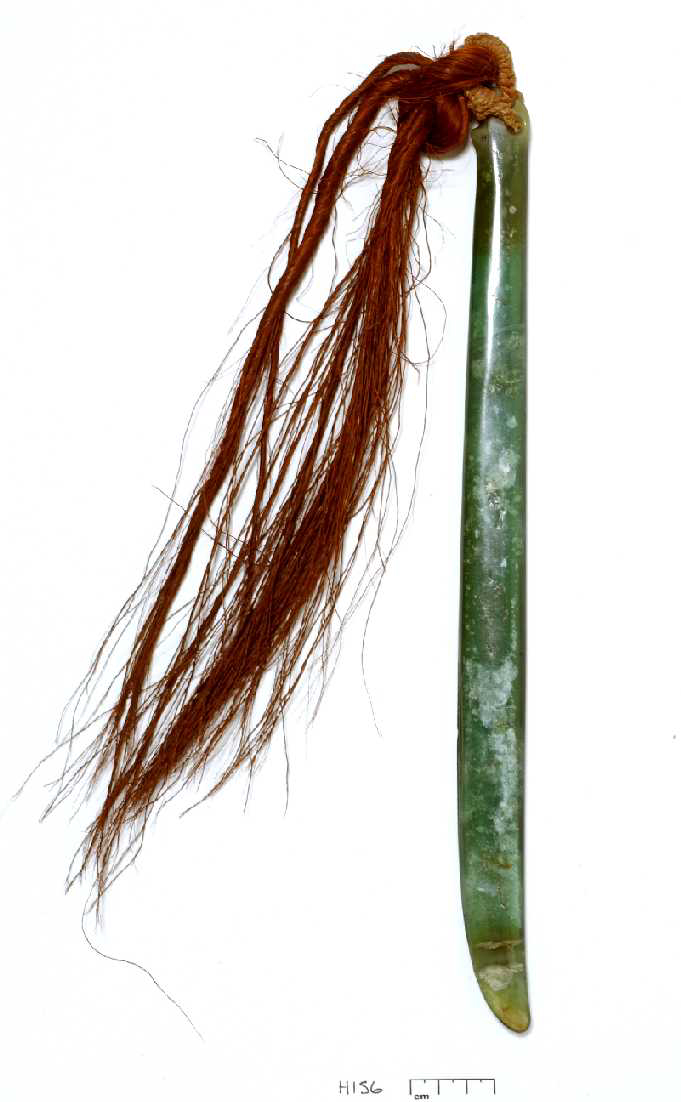
H000156- Ear ornament or tangiwai

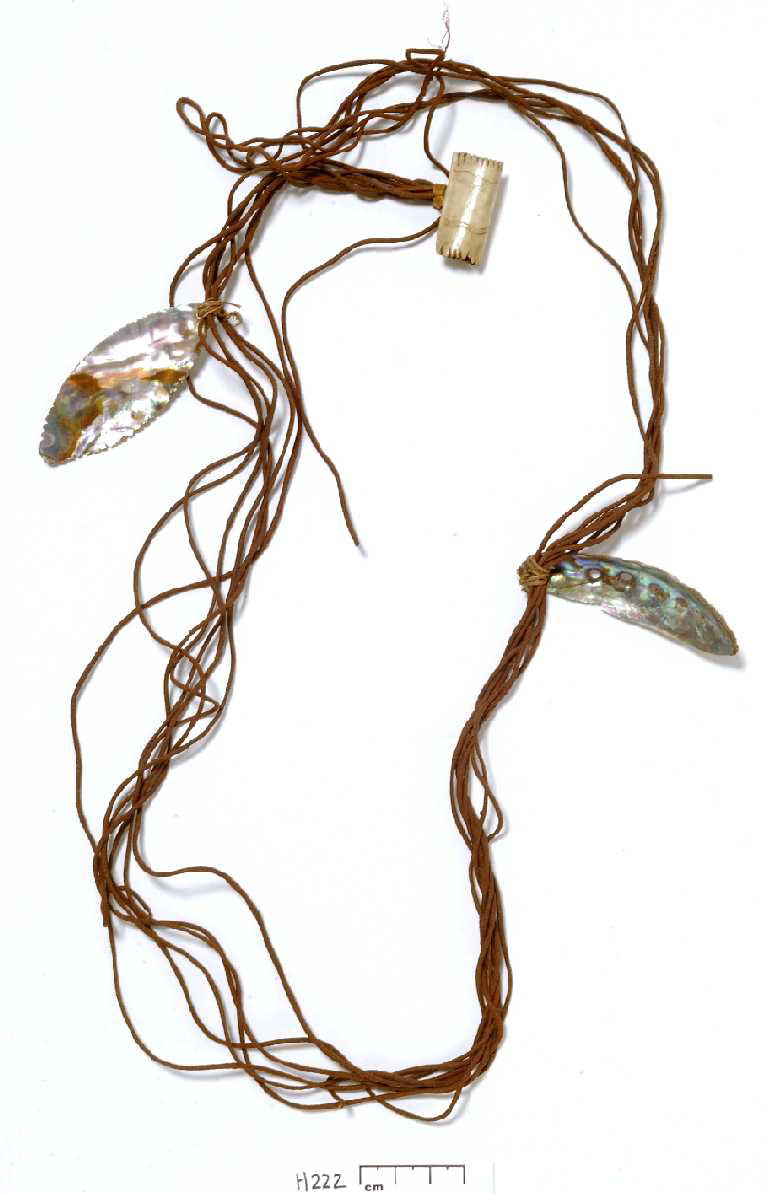
H000222- Neck ornament

=== Society Islands ===
The island of Tahiti, the largest of the 14 Society Islands, was where Cook had his first contact with Pacific Islanders. Samuel Wallis had visited Tahiti on HMS Dolphin (1751) in June–July 1767. A brisk trade developed, and large quantities of iron nails and spikes were exchanged for barkcloth, fish hooks, pearls, shells, adzes and other tools. The Frenchman Louis-Antoine de Bougainville also visited in 1768, and the artefacts and stories brought back to Europe from these 2 voyages helped to create the vision of Tahiti as a south pacific paradise.

The Royal Society chose Tahiti as a suitable place to observe the astronomical event of the Transit of Venus, and for this purpose Cook was sent on his first voyage. On 13 April 1769, after eight months at sea, the Endeavour arrived at Tahiti's Matavai Bay, the same inlet that the Dolphin had visited 2 years before (4 men from the Dolphin had joined Cook's crew). The islanders welcomed Cook and Banks with green banana branches, calling them TAIO or friend, and giving them gifts of perfumed cloth. Soon afterwards a procession of canoes entered the bay and 'Queen' Purea presented Cook with a pig and fresh food, which was reciprocated by Cook with beads and trinkets.

The nearby promontory which Cook named Point Venus was used to observe the Transit of the planet Venus across the face of the Sun on 3 June 1769. Although this phenomenon was observed at 26 different points around the world, astronomers later realised that the telescopes of the day weren't precise enough to accomplish the task of accurately determining the distance between the Earth and the Sun.

Cook and Banks later circumnavigated the island of Tahiti and then visited the Bora Bora group, guided by a Tahitian priest Tupaia, who with his servant travelled on the Endeavour to Batavia, where he became ill and died.

The Endeavour spent 3 months altogether in the Society Islands, and Cook's ships were to return 3 more times during later voyages (Aug–Sep 1773, April–May 1774, and Aug–Sep 1777). During these visits there was a constant exchange of goods and gifts. Iron nails and axes were valued, and provisions, fish hooks, adzes and barkcloth were exchanged for these. A large number of objects were therefore collected, and many detailed drawings and maps of the islands were produced.

The items collected cannot be identified to a particular island or voyage, and before Cook arrived there had been a flourishing exchange of artefacts and ideas between the islands. Banks enjoyed the opportunities to witness and sometimes participate in Tahitian life. He took part in a heiva public dance ceremony, accompanied by drums and nose flute (see H000143). He was also allowed to take part in a mourning ceremony and was fascinated by the costume worn by the chief mourner. According to Forster none of these were collected until the 2nd voyage, when parts of at least 10 were taken to England. Tha Australian Museum's collection has an example of the shell breast ornament component (see H000149). Semicircular breast ornaments, or gorgets, were commonly worn, and many were collected by the crew and valued as a special type of artificial curiosity (see H000105 and H000145). Barkcloth was presented in large pieces on several occasions to the visitors. Much of the cloth collected was cut into pieces and placed in books of barkcloth samples.

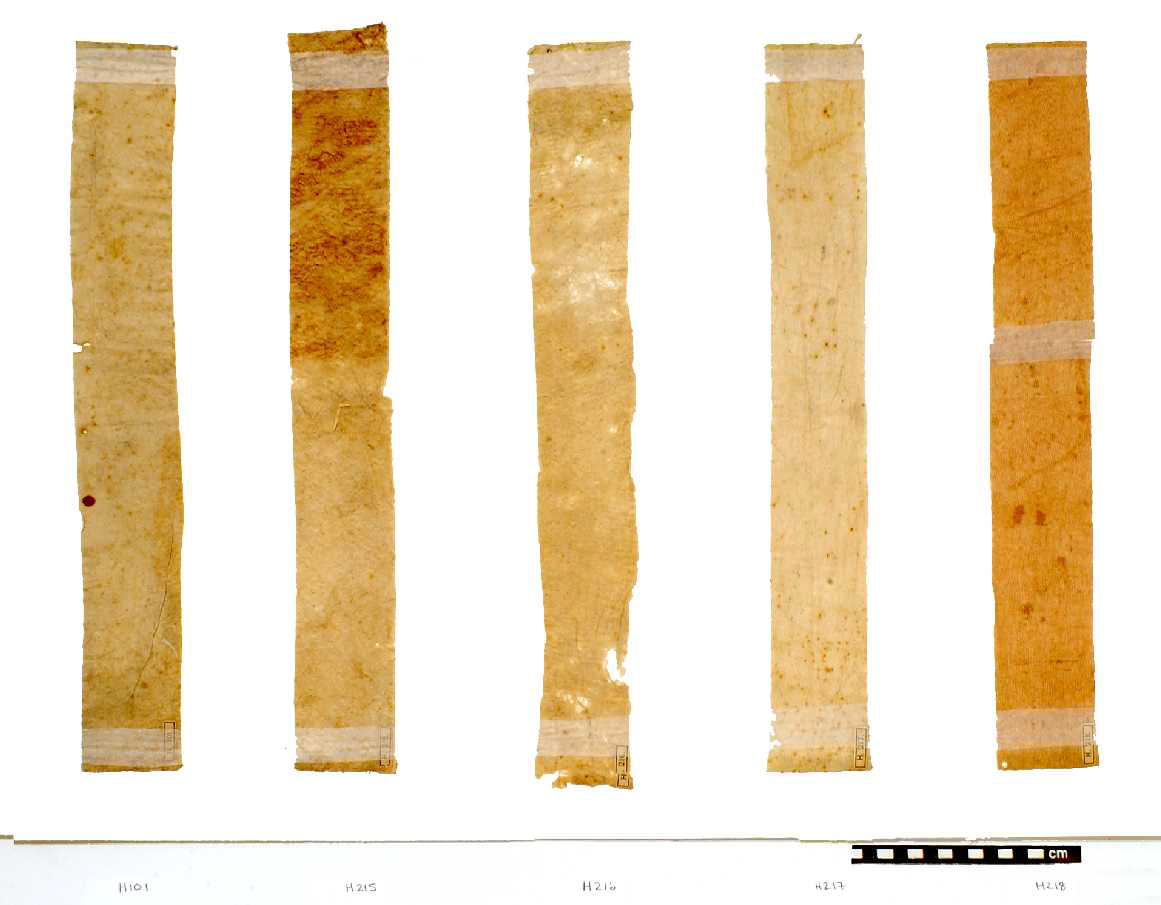
H000101- Bark cloth

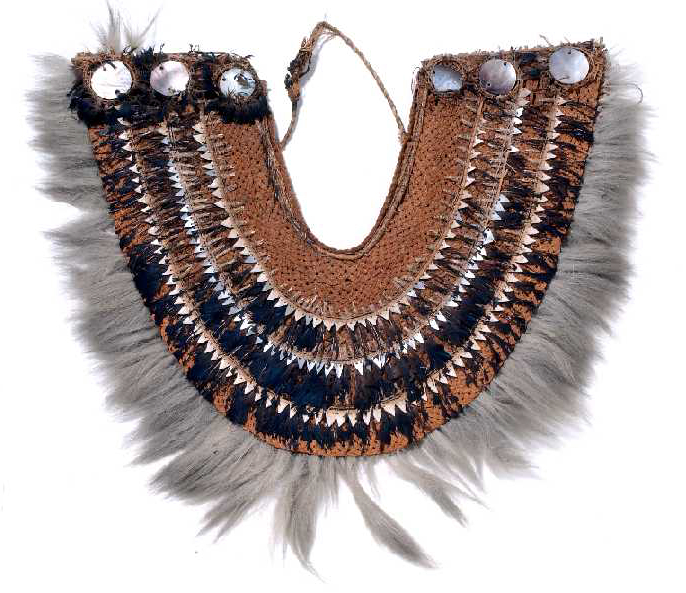
H000105- Breast Ornament

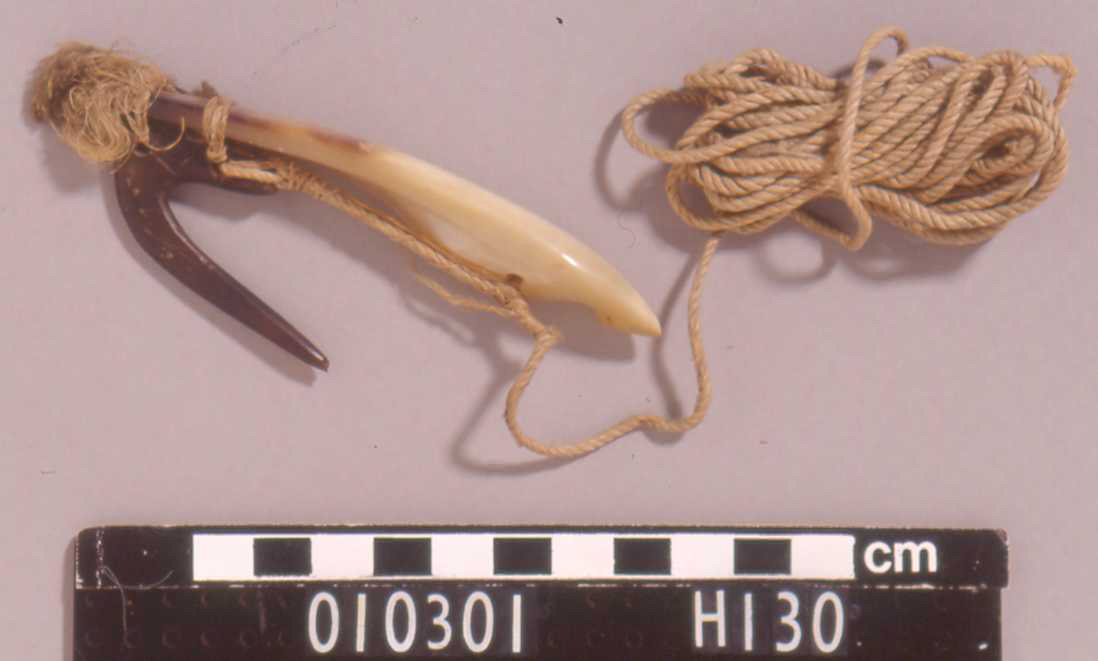
H000130- Fish hook

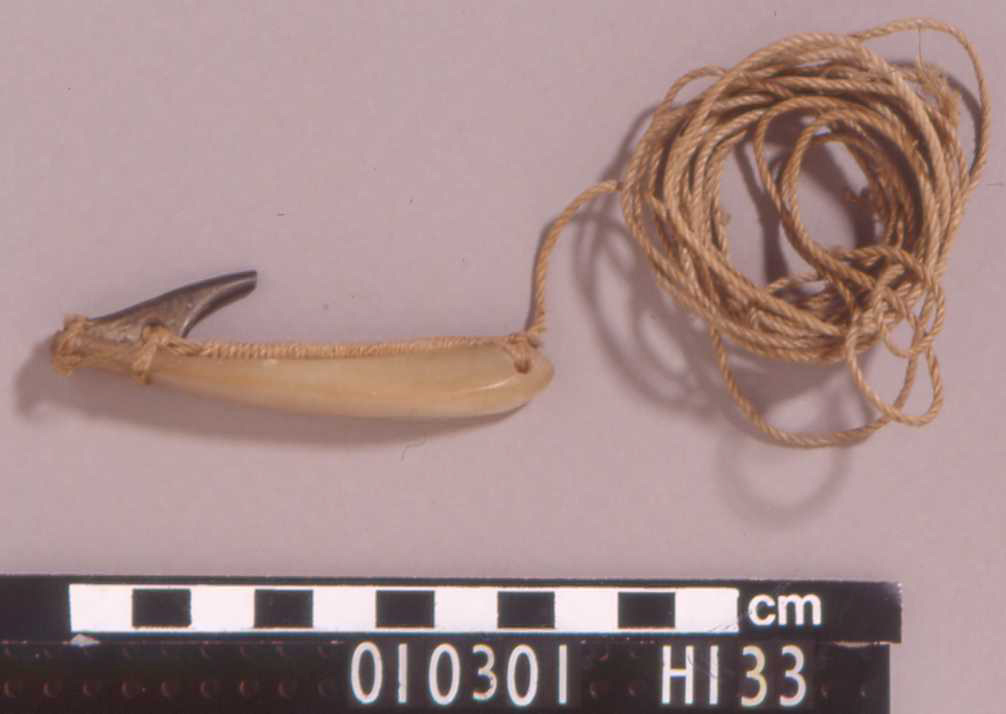
H000133- Fish hook

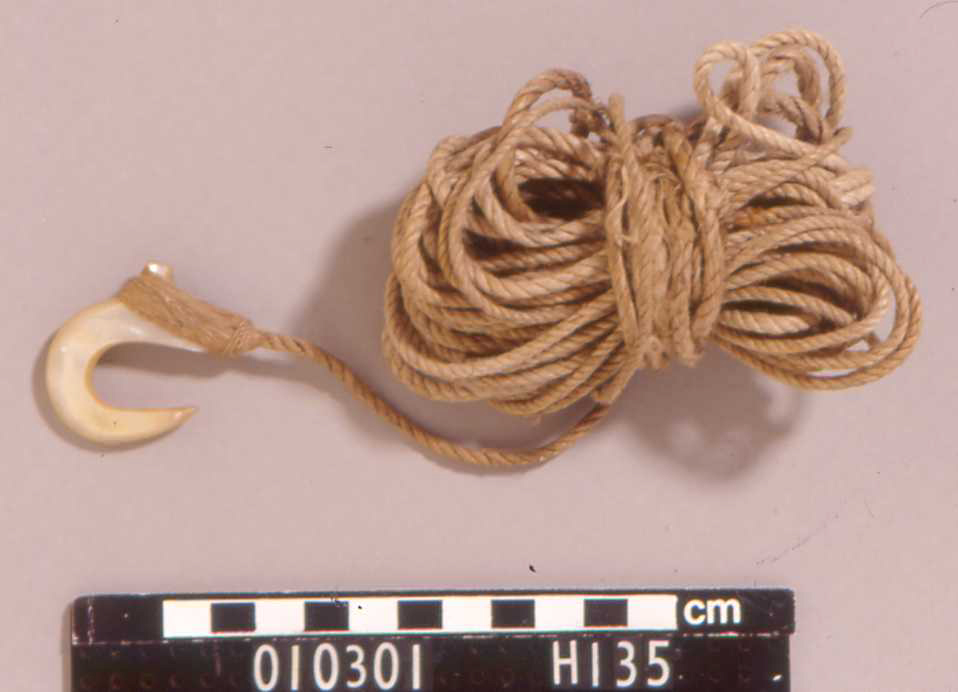
H000135- Fish hook

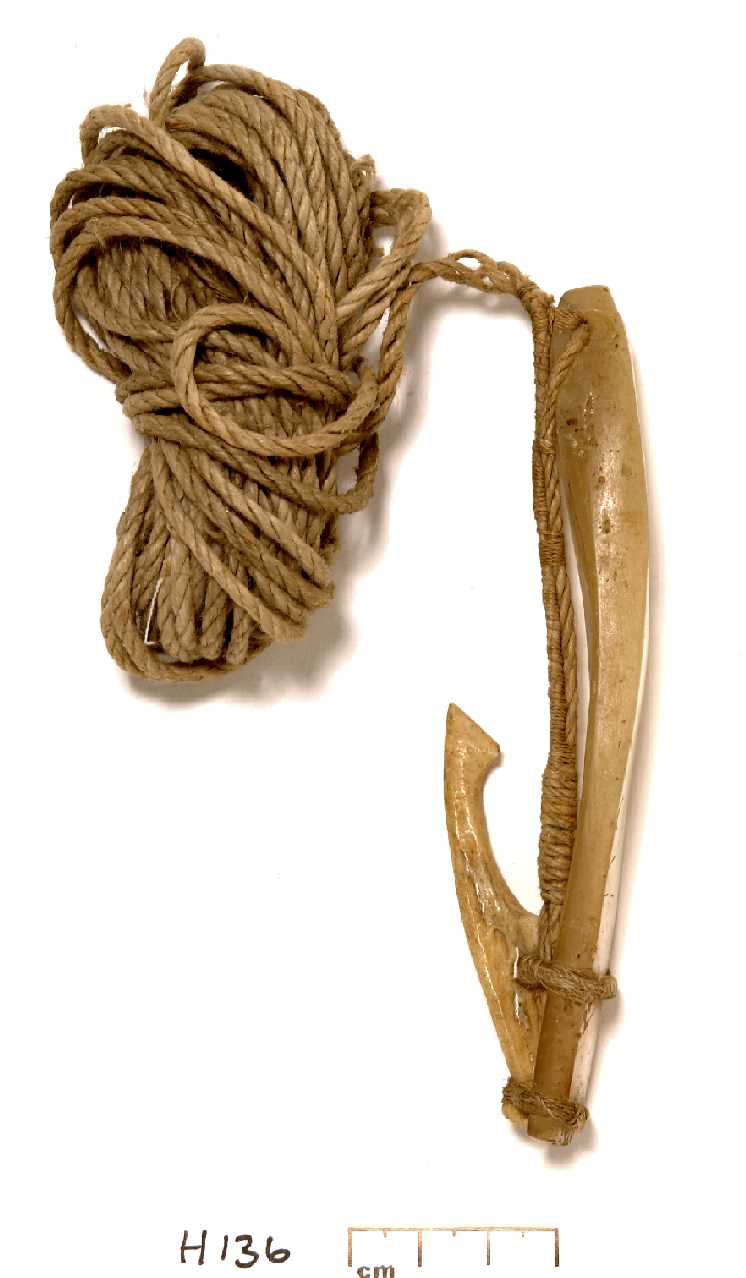
H000136- Fish hook

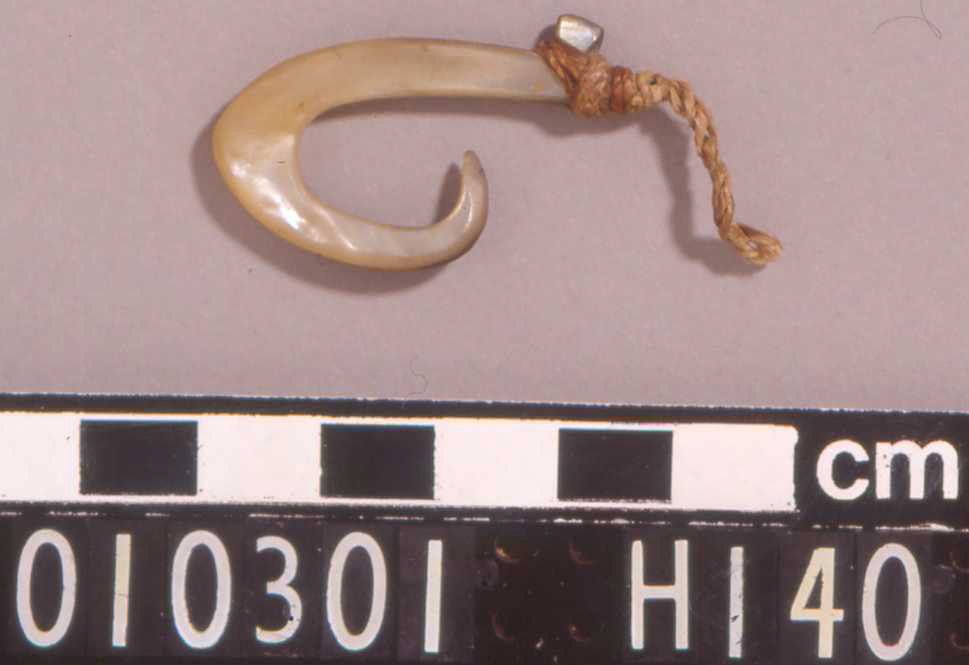
H000140- Fish hook

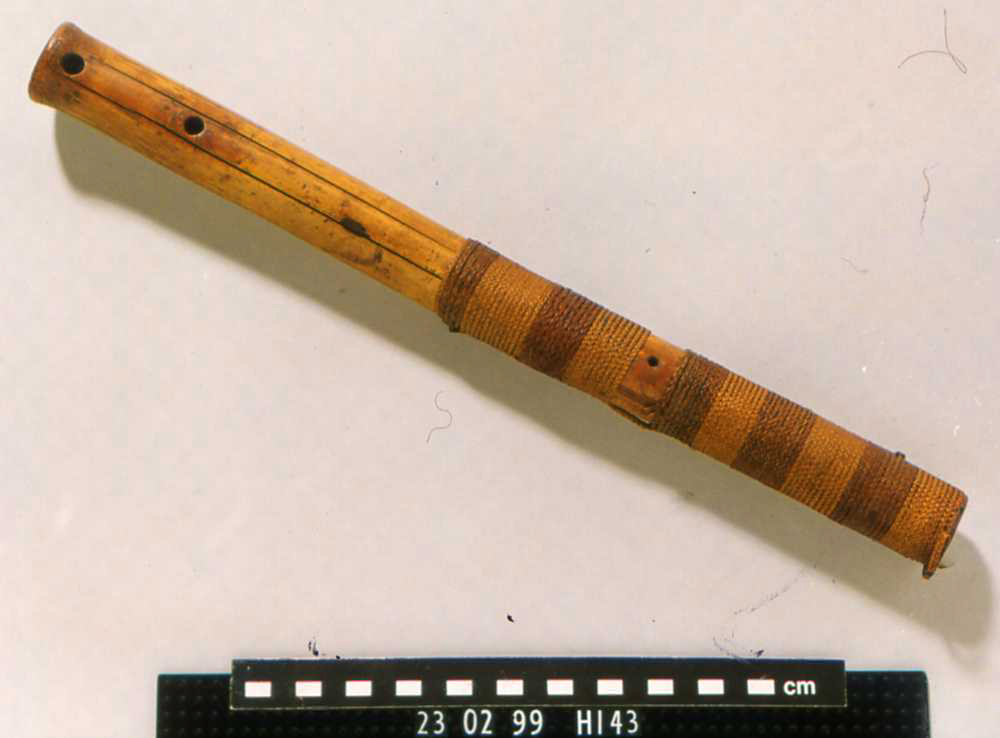
H000143- Nose flute

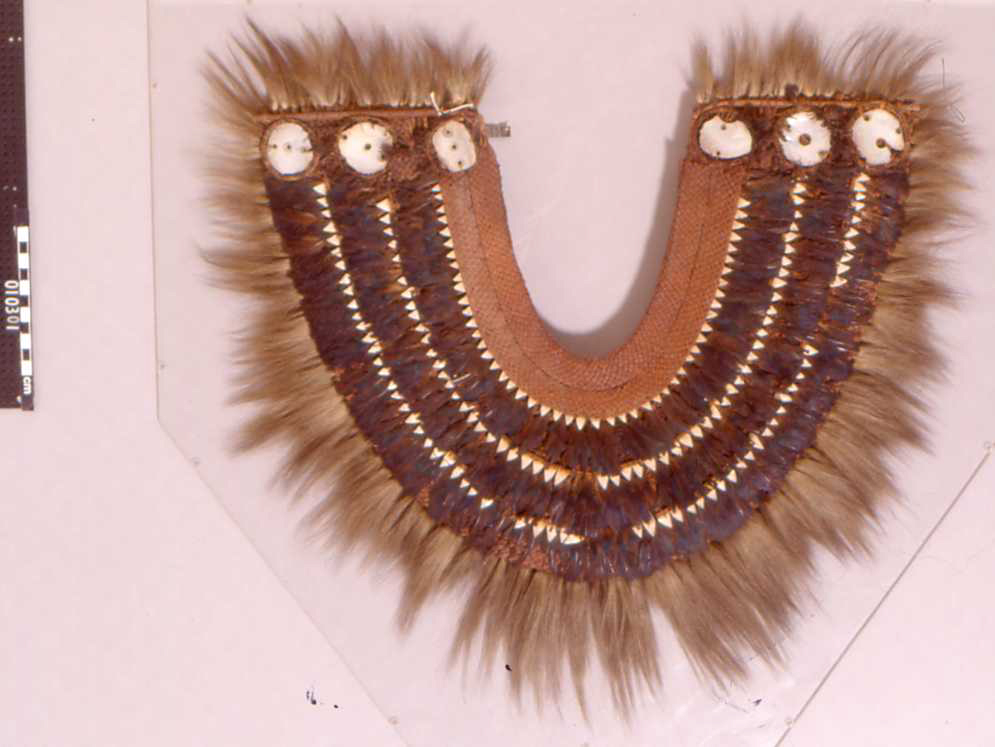
H000145- Breast ornament

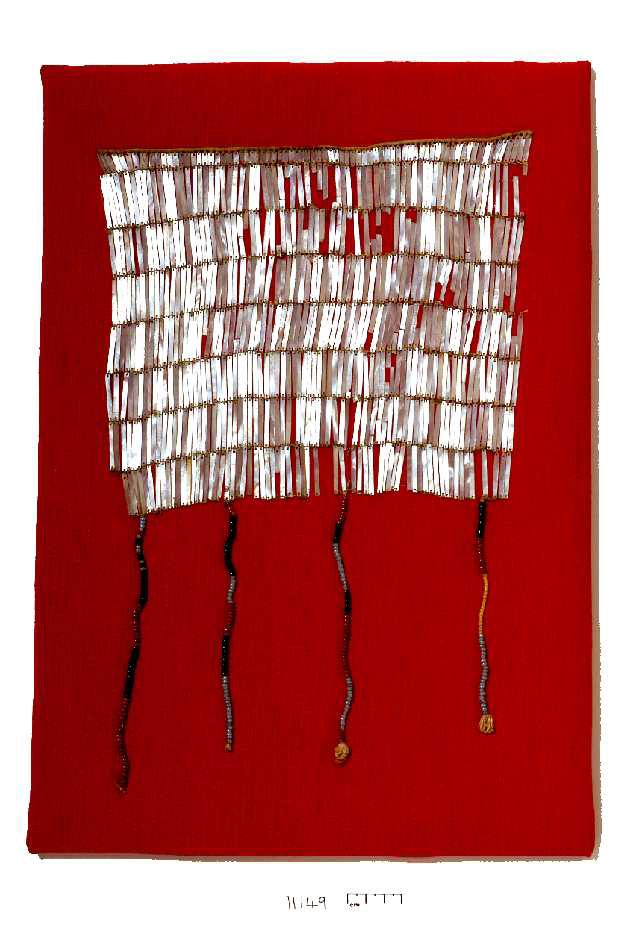
H000149- Chest ornament

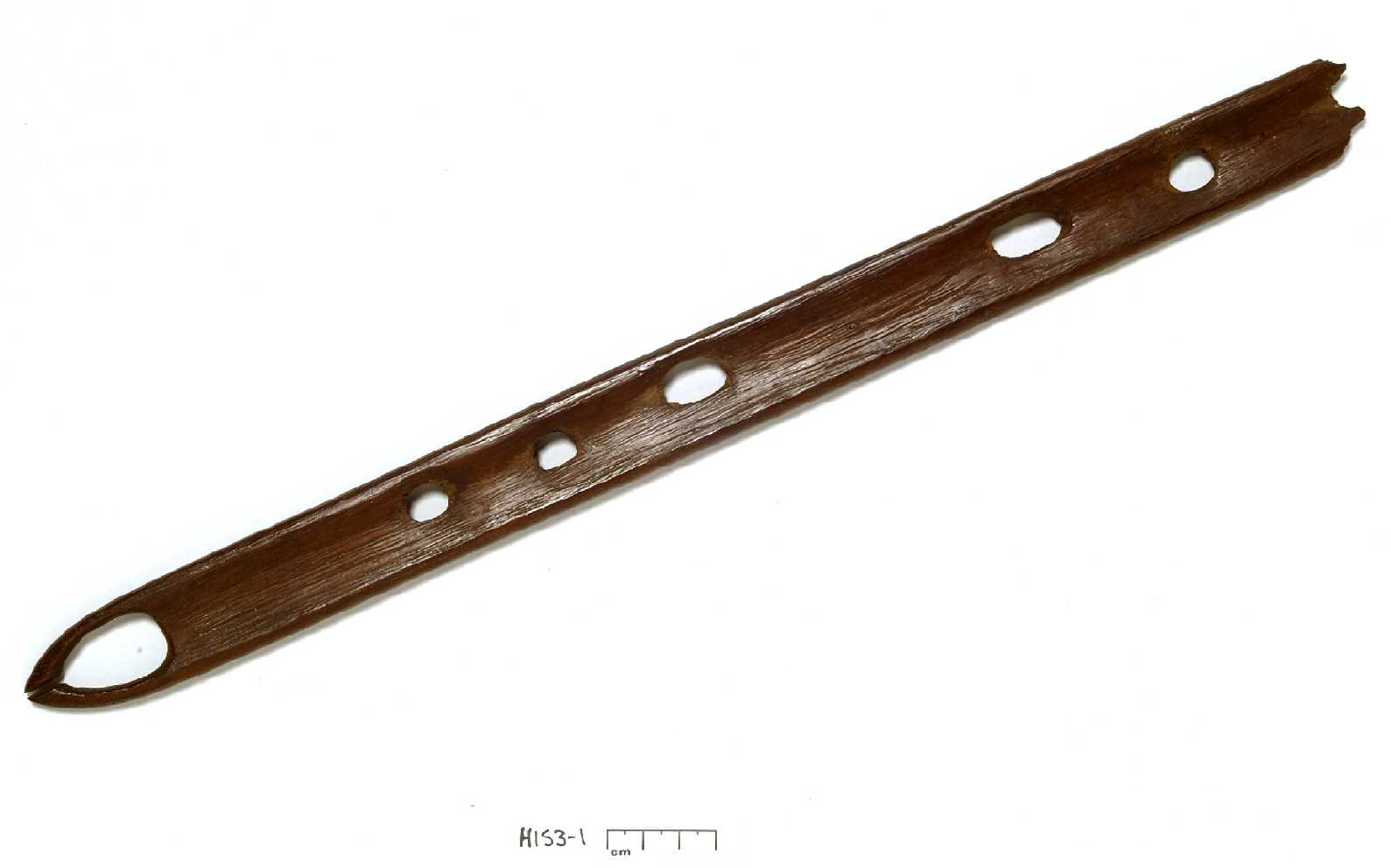
H000153- Wooden net needle

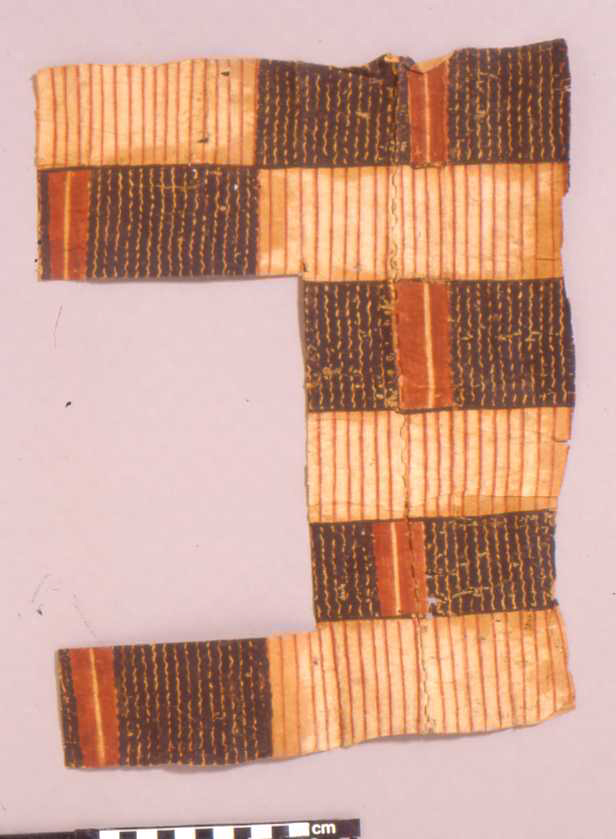
H000212- Bark cloth

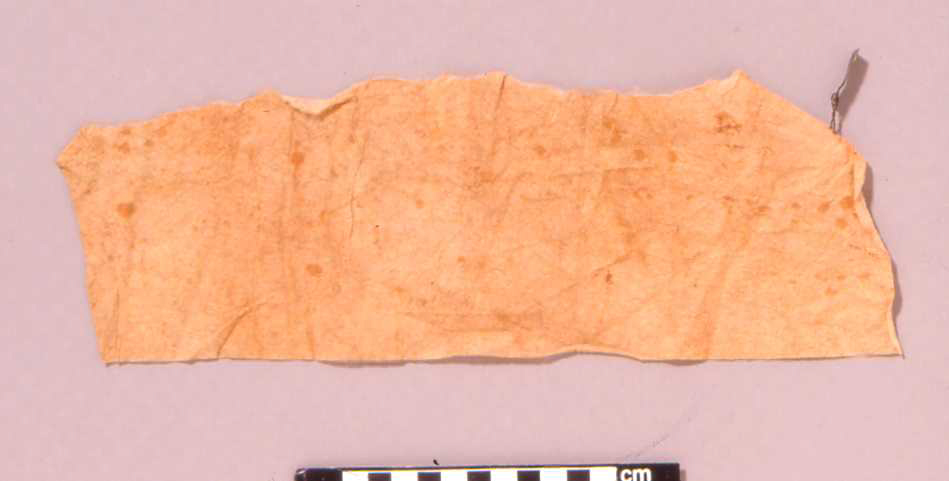
H000218- Bark cloth

=== Tonga ===
The Tongan islands were visited by Le Maire in 1616, and Abel Tasman in 1643, but there are no identified Tongan artefacts collected from these voyages. The northern islands were sighted by the Englishman Samuel Wallis in 1767, and Cook's ships visited the islands for a few days in 1773 and then again briefly in June 1774. He named them the Friendly Islands and returned on his third voyage in April–July 1777. It was known that Wallis had traded iron nails for a club in 1767, and the iron tools traded during Cook's second voyage stimulated different carving techniques which are evident in wooden artefacts collected on the third voyage.

Many specimens were collected from Tonga and many are specific to a particular voyage. Some items collected were of Fijian and Samoan origin, and this fact documents the pre-existing trade the Tongans had with their neighbours. Many body ornaments were collected, such as H000151- a small ivory human figure, probably strung on cord and worn as a neck ornament, and 3 shell necklaces H000116, H000117, H000152. Several kinds of pandanus mats were collected (H000098), as were many baskets of different styles and materials (H000102, a KATO MOSI KAKA beaded basket). Fly whisks, food preparation equipment, bowls, neck rests, noseflutes, panpipes, and various tools were collected, but the Australian Museum collection does not include examples of these. Some fishing equipment is present – a fish net H000144, and 11 fish hooks H000121- H000134. Combs collected were made from the midribs of coconut leaflets, intertwined with fine sennit cord to make decorative patterns.

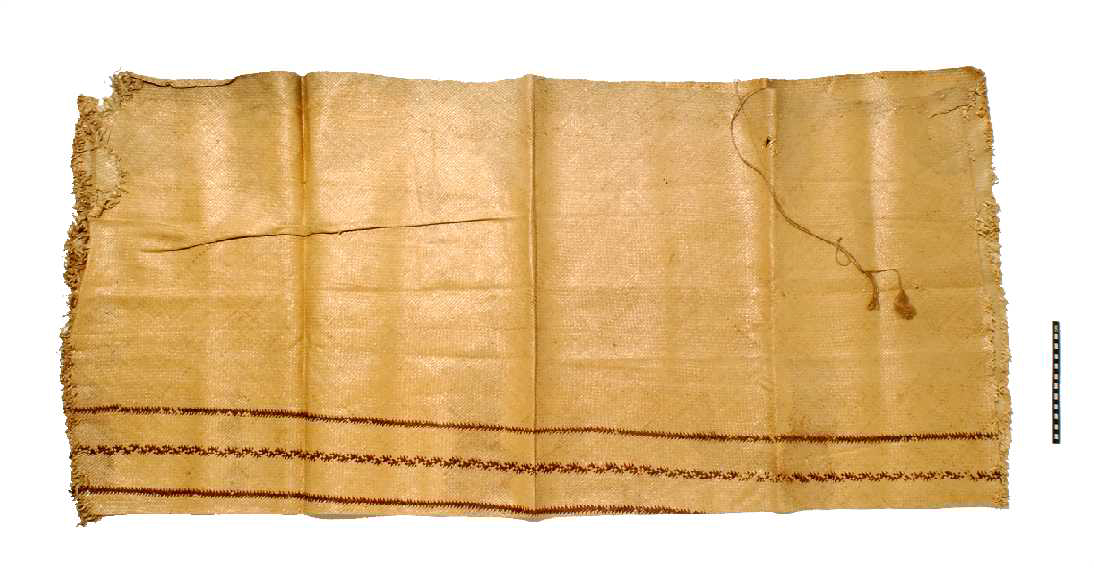
H000098- Woven mat

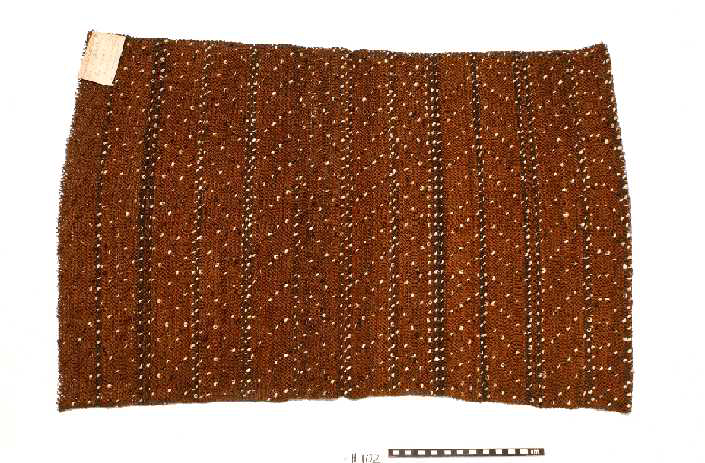
H000102- Basket

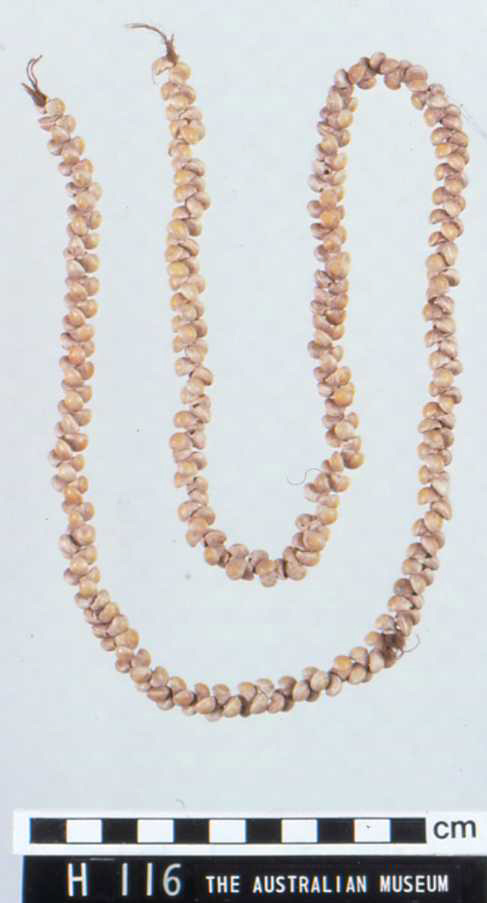
H000116- Neck ornament

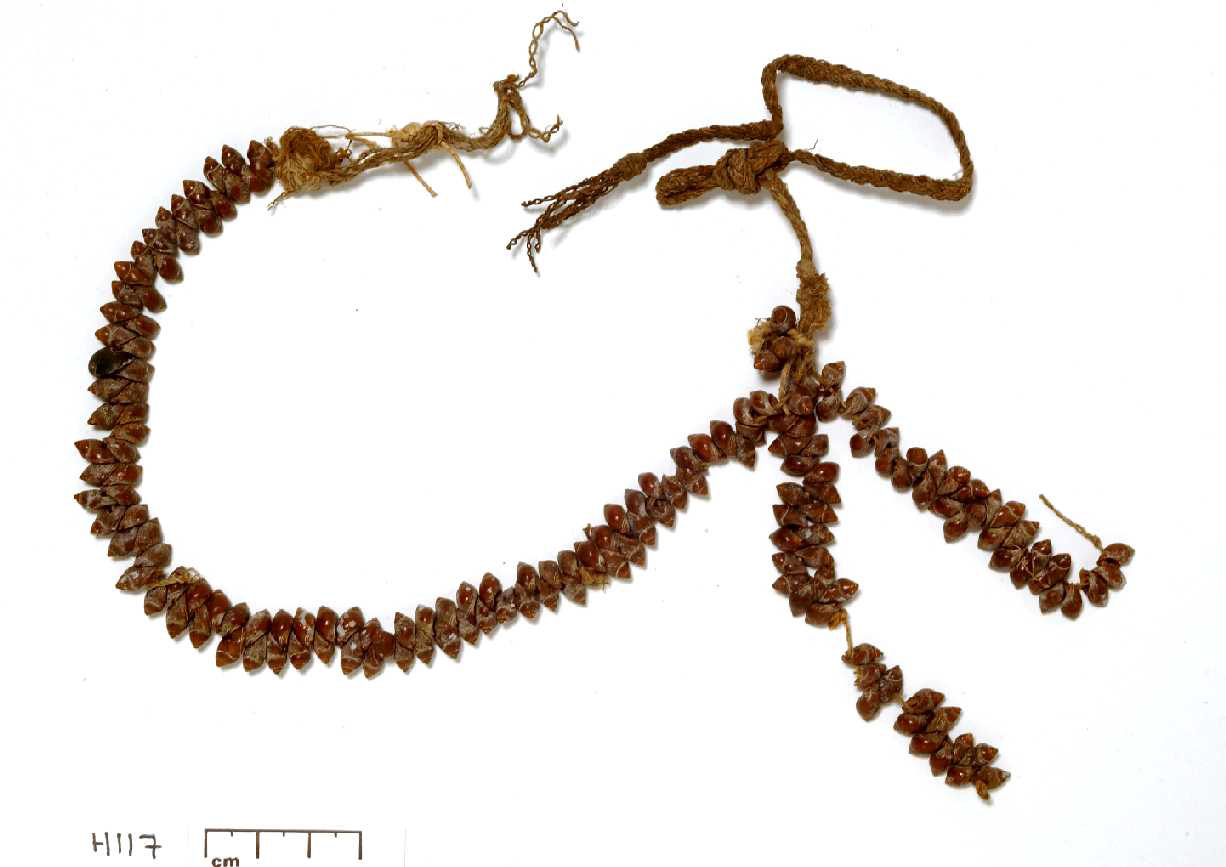
H000117- Neck ornament

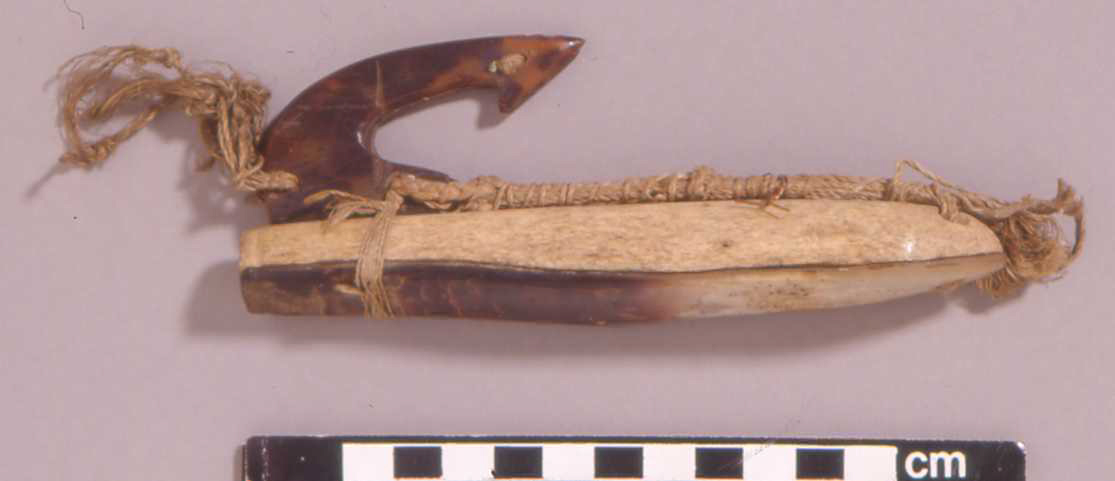
H000121- Fish hook

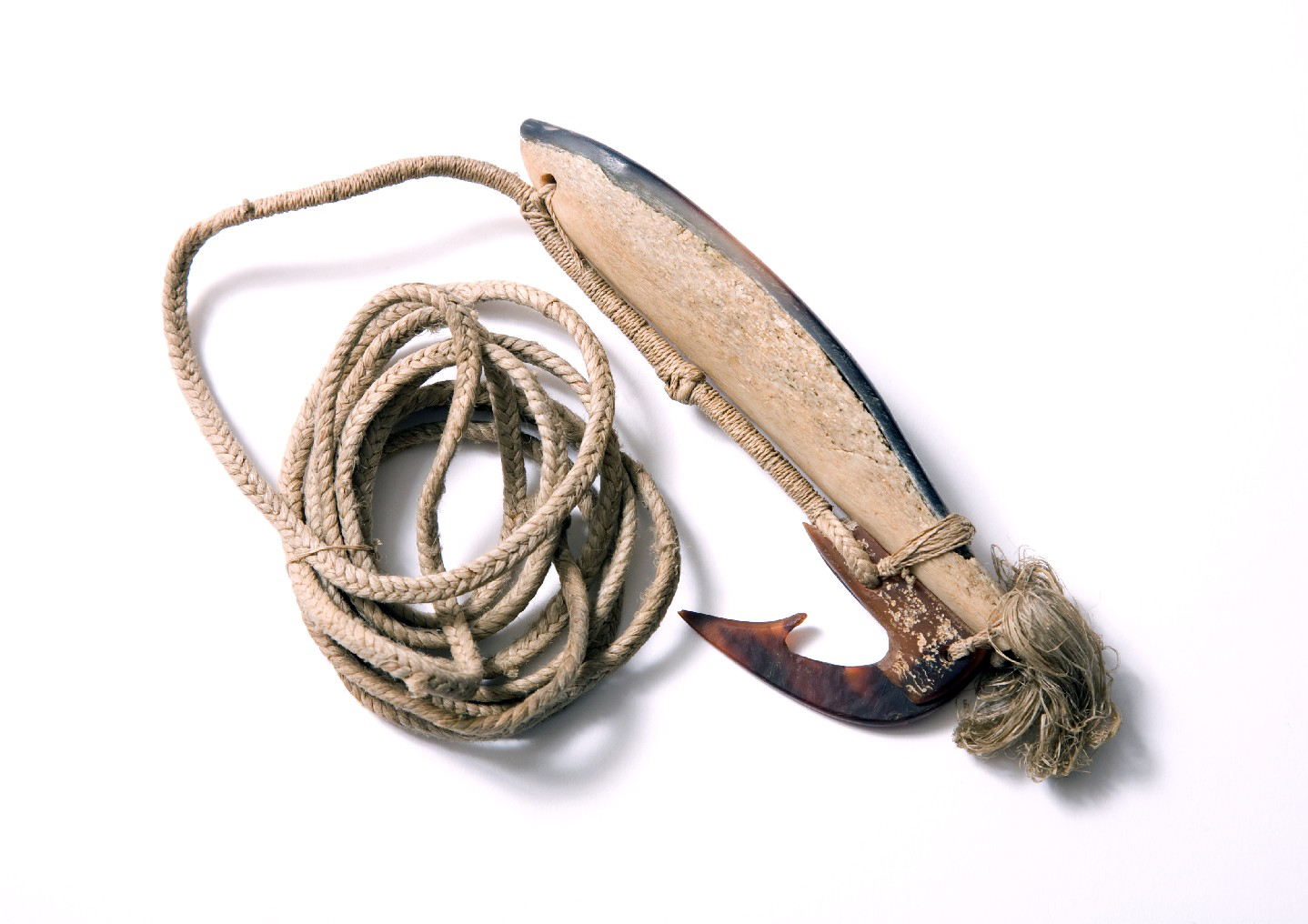
H000128- Fish hook

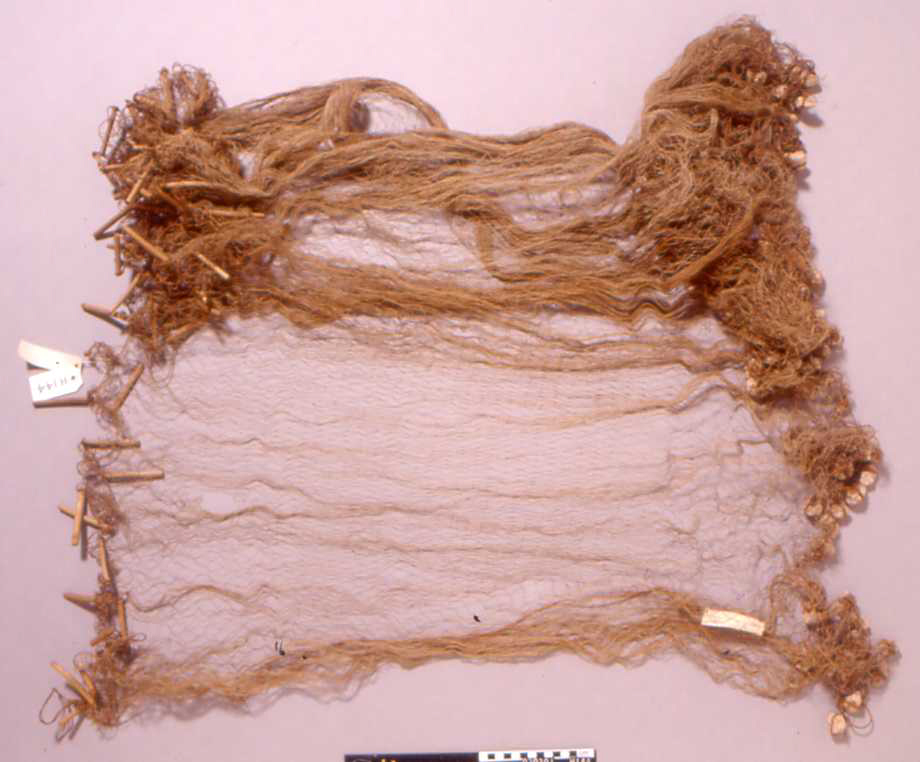
H000144- Fishing net

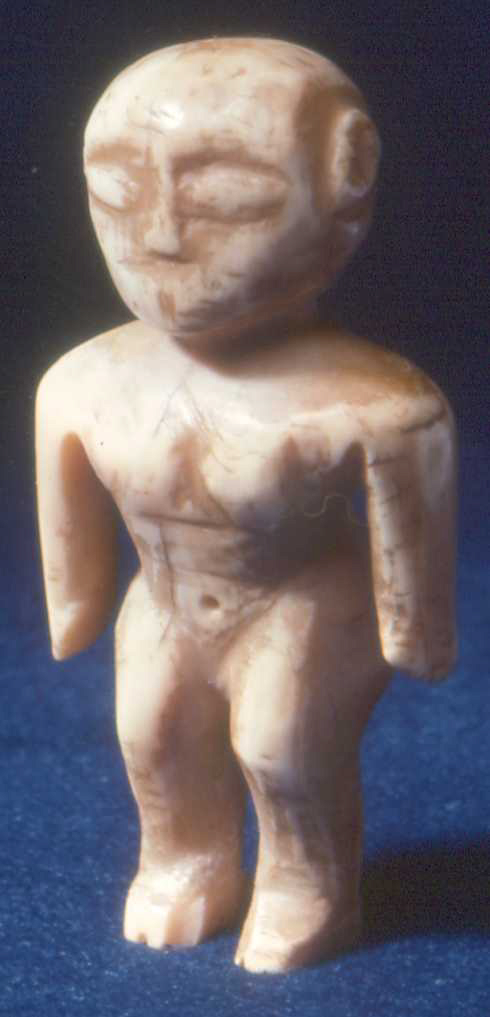
H000151- Carved Figure

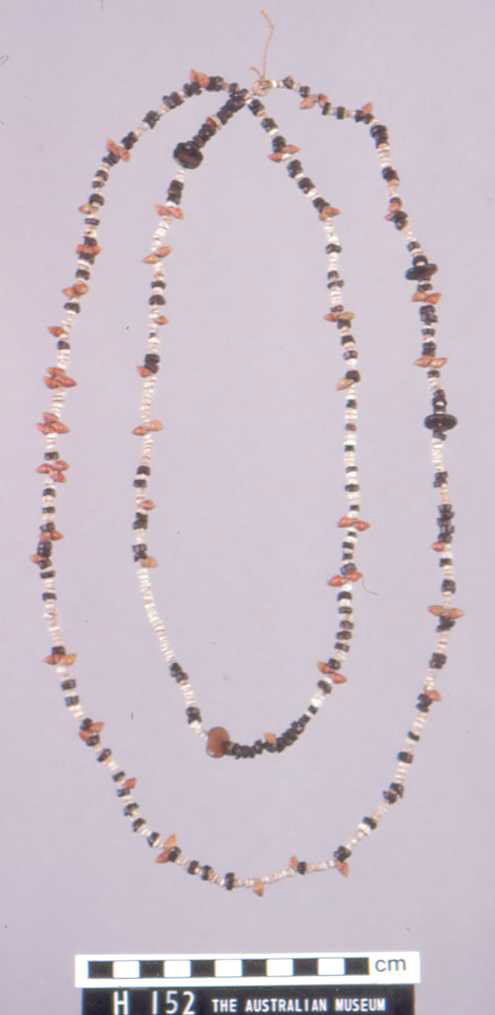
H000152- Neck ornament

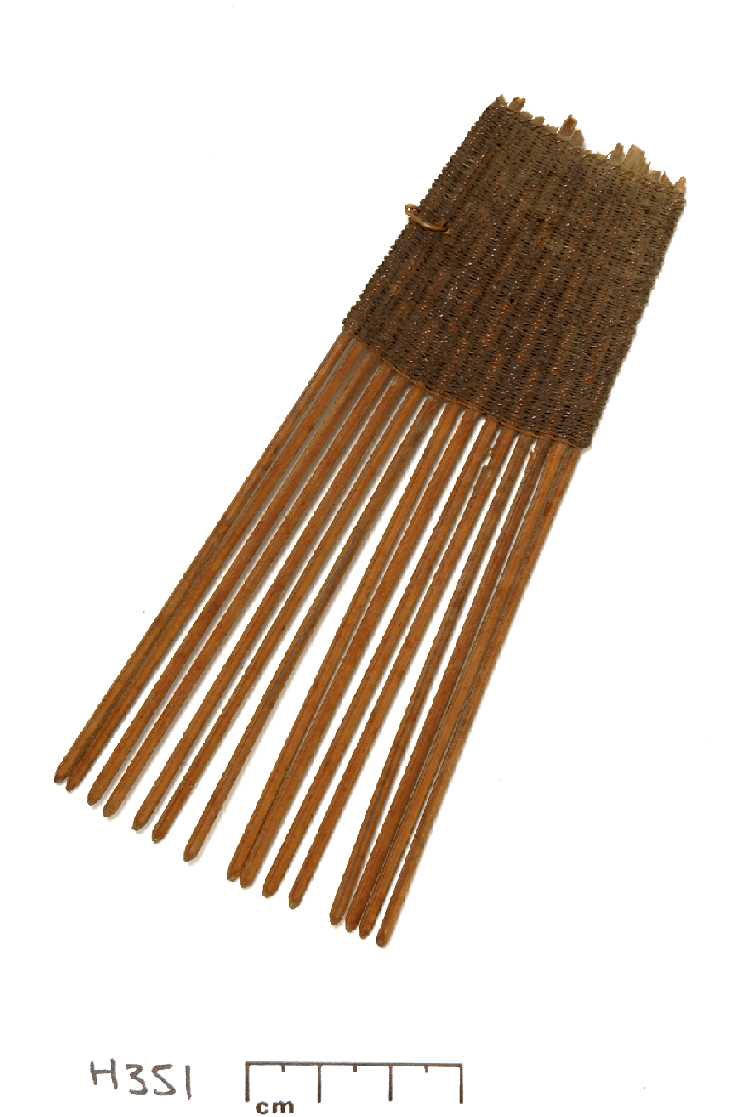
H000351- Comb

=== Vanuatu ===
Quiros had named the islands of Vanuatu Australia Del Espiritu Santo, and Bougainville had visited in 1768. Cook made three landings on his second voyage on the islands of Malakula, Erromango, and Tanna, and renamed the group the New Hebrides. There was open warfare, except for Tanna, so it is likely that all the non-weapons in Cook collections came from Tanna. Panpipes (H000112) in the AM collection have been attributed to Tanna. The arrows H000158-H000170 have also been attributed to Vanuatu. There are three clubs in the Banks collection that may possibly have been collected on Cook's second voyage – H000292-H000295, H000366 – can be compared to those in the Forster collection in Göttingen.

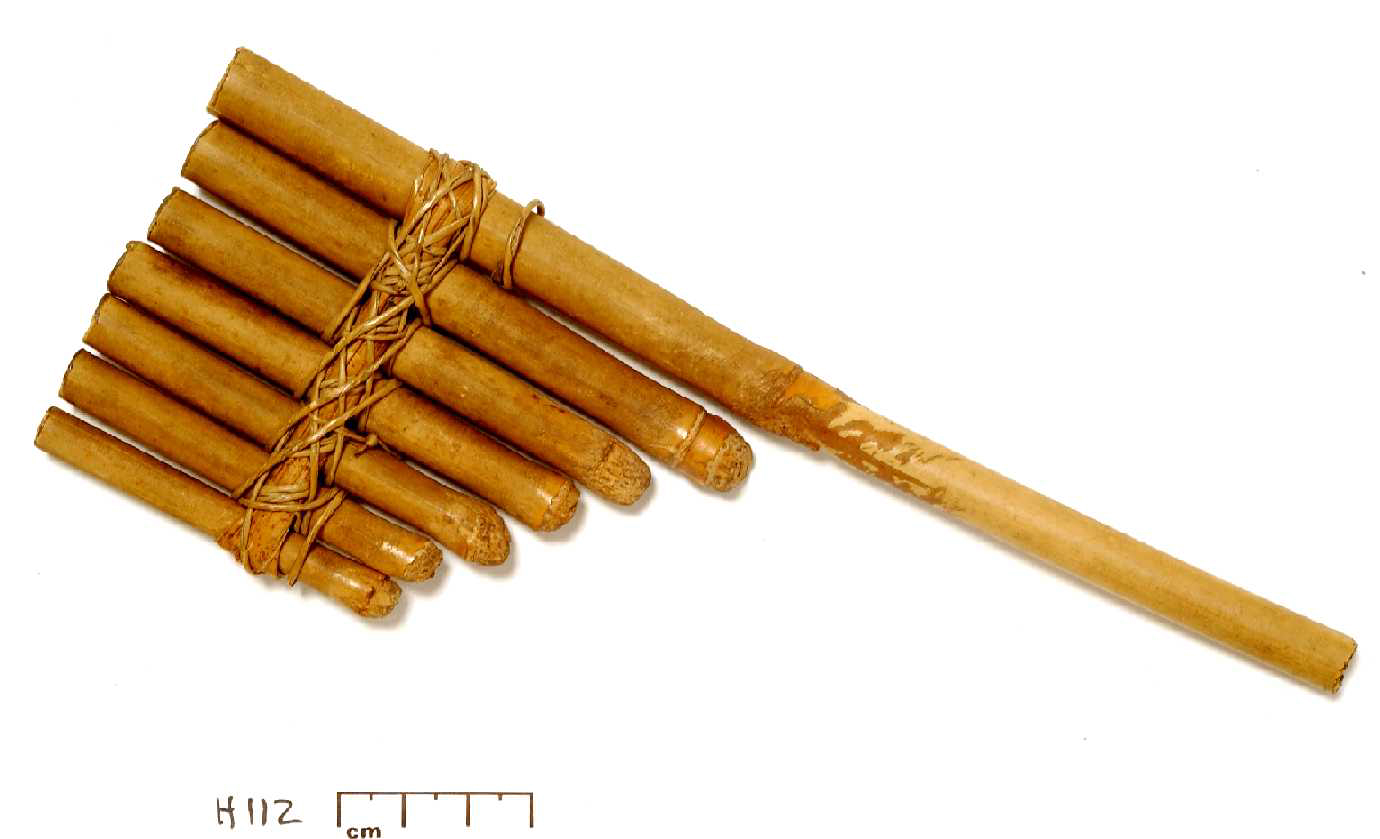
H000112- Pan Pipes

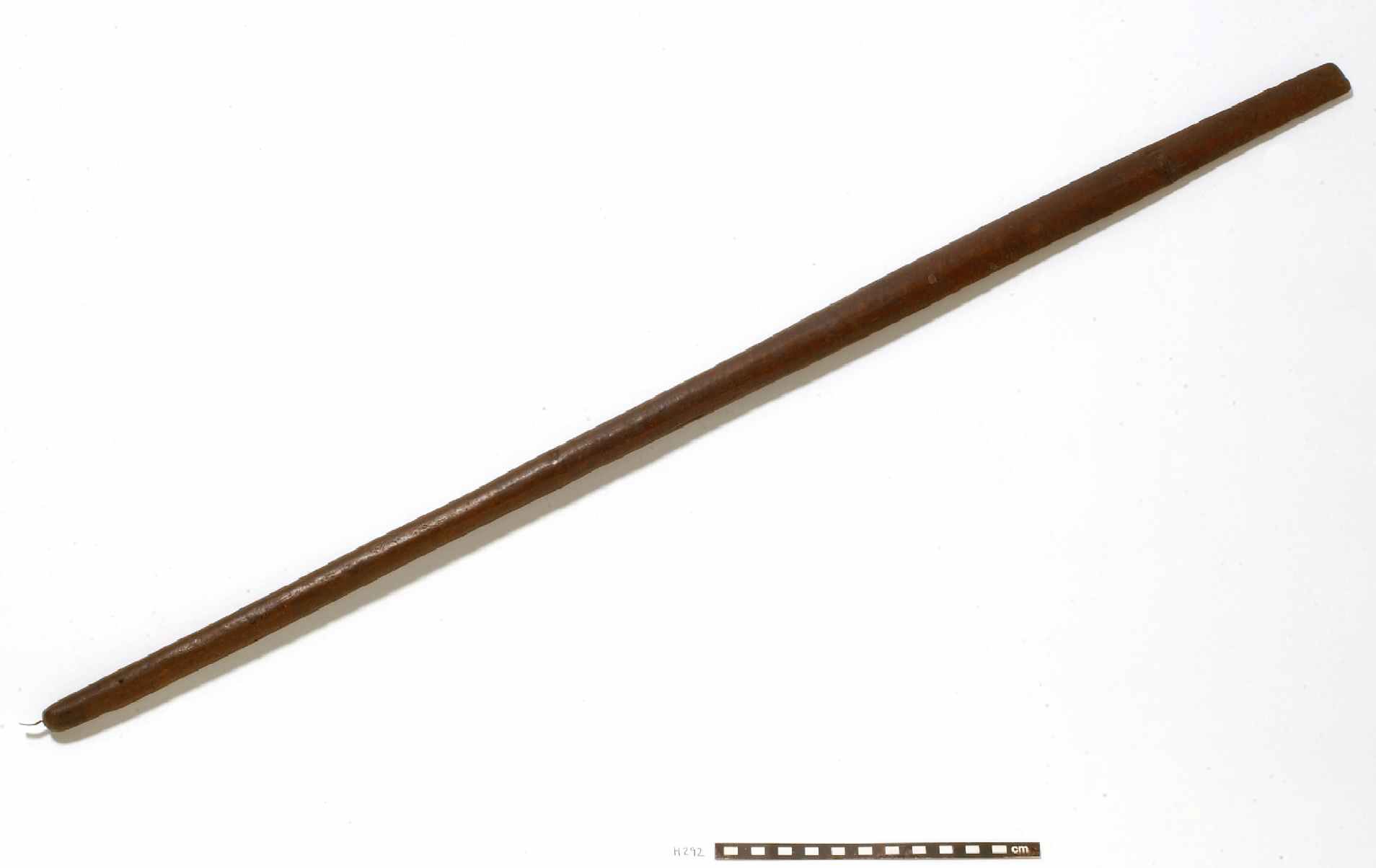
H000292- Club

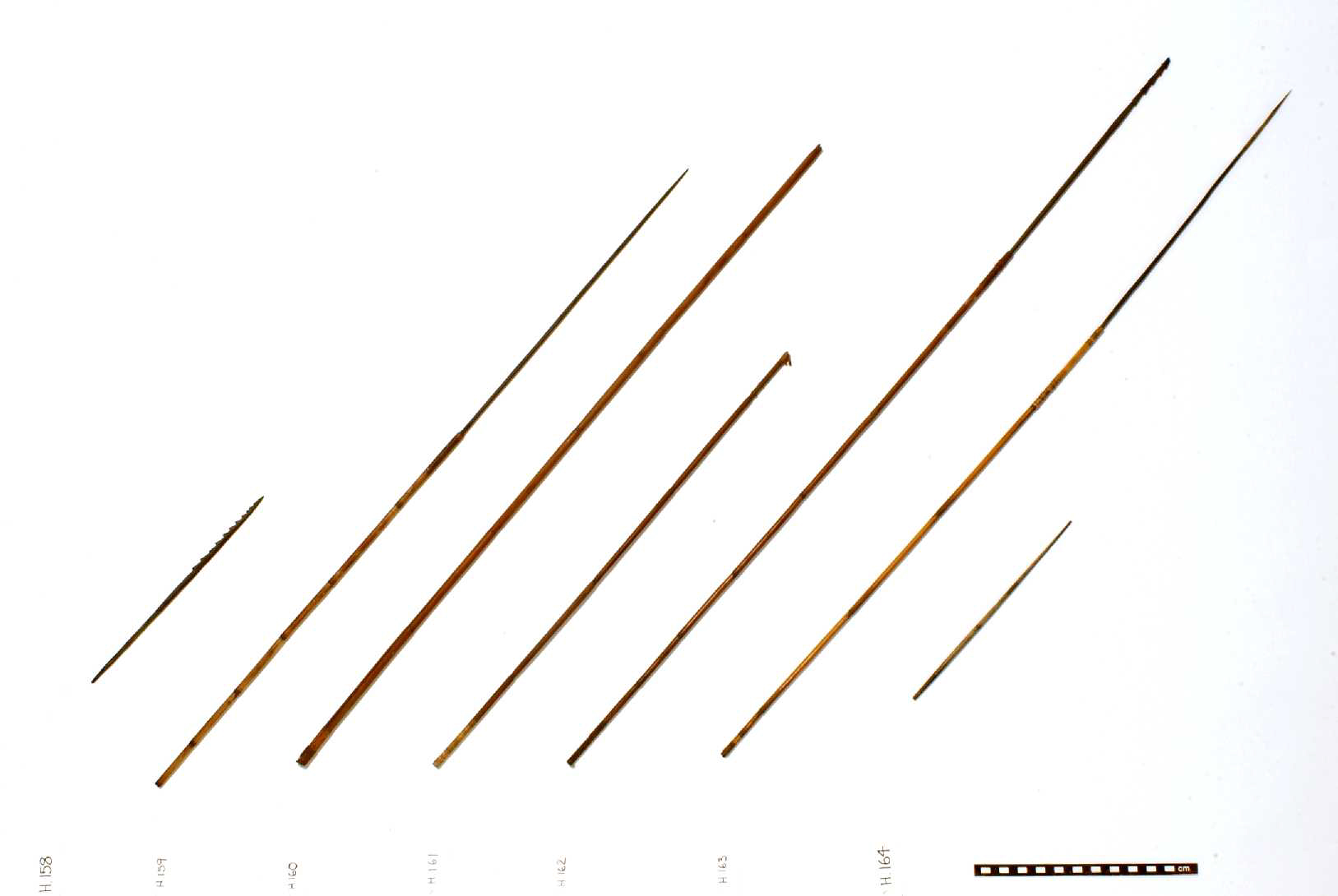
H000158-164- Arrow heads

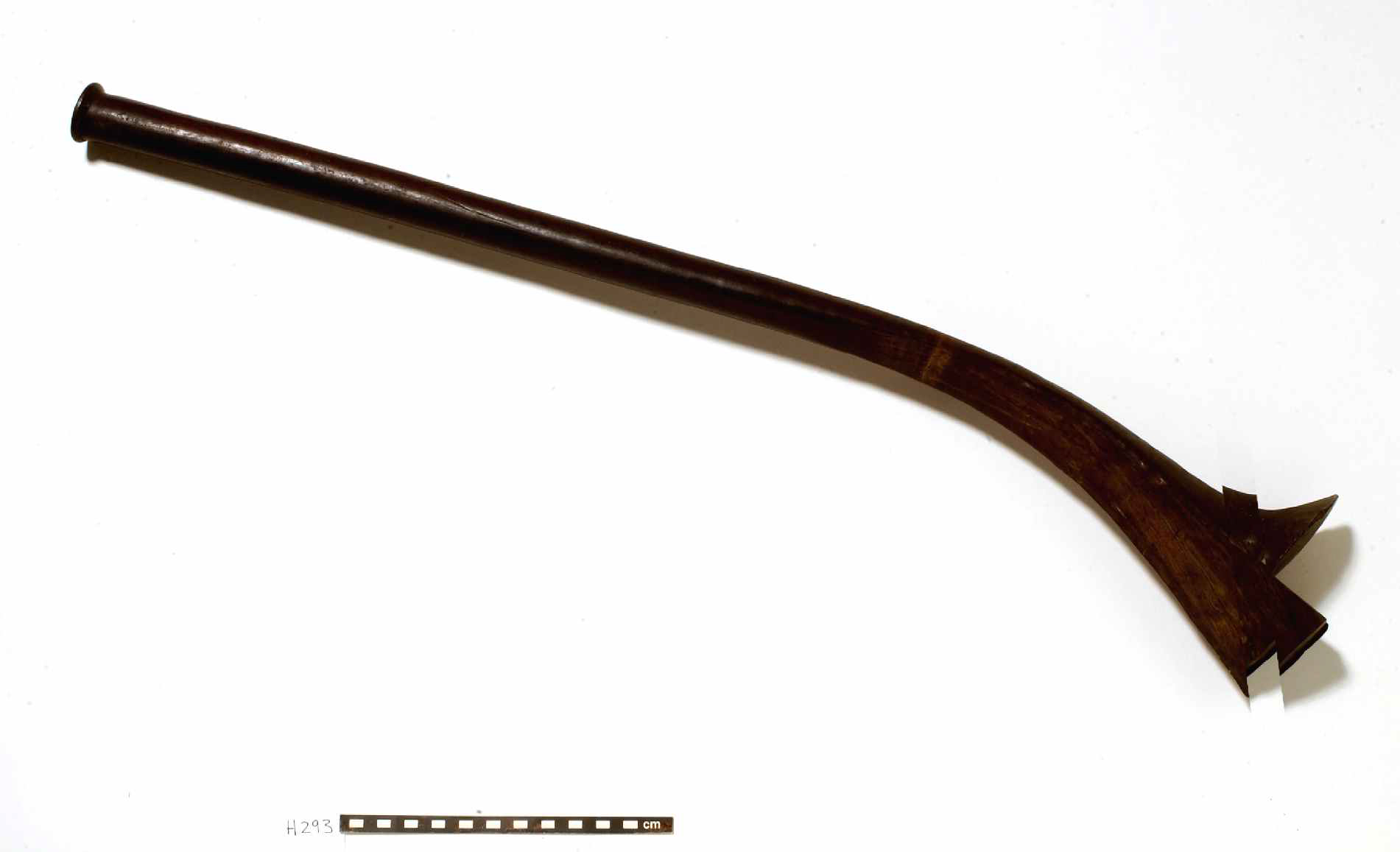
H000293- Club

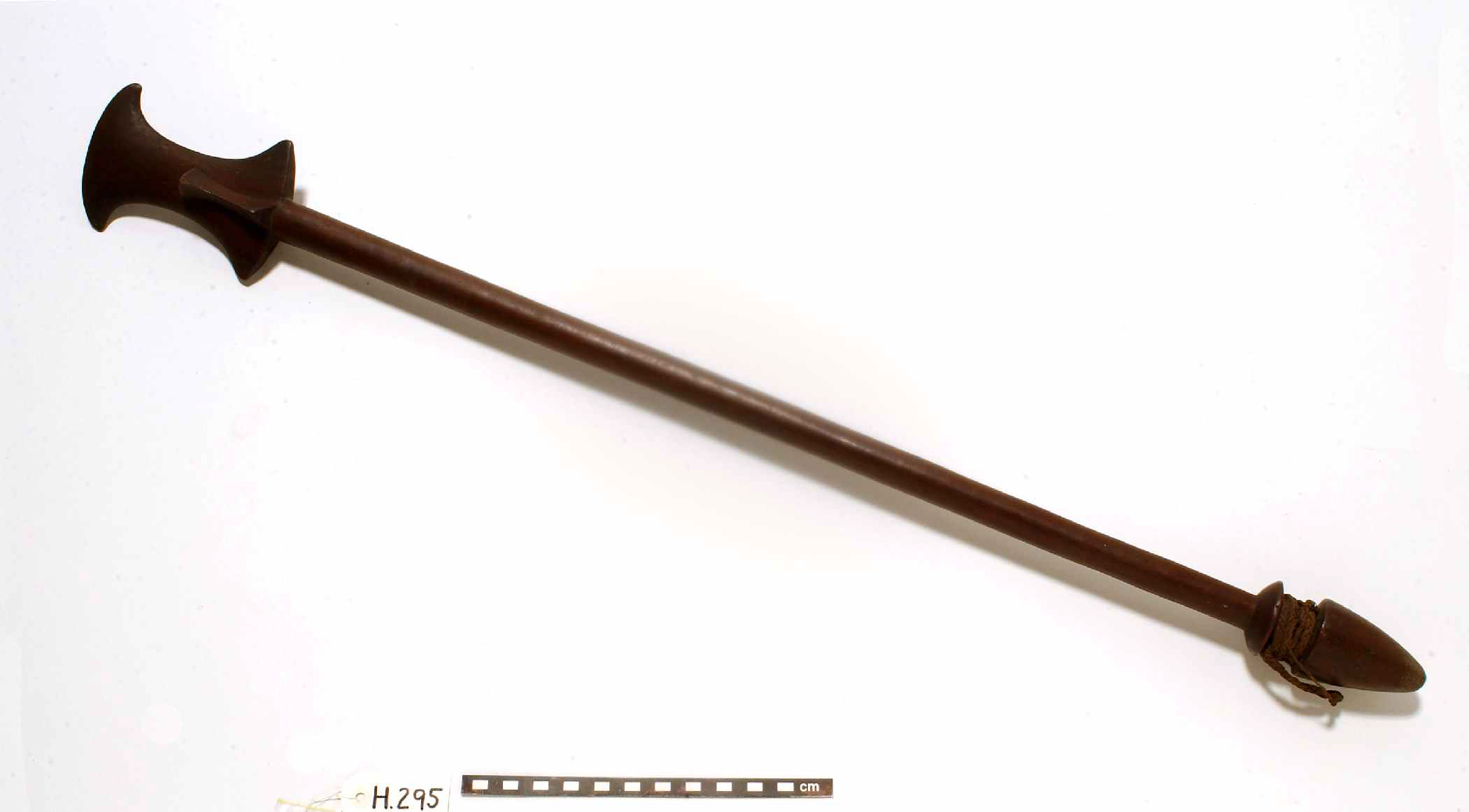
H000295- Club

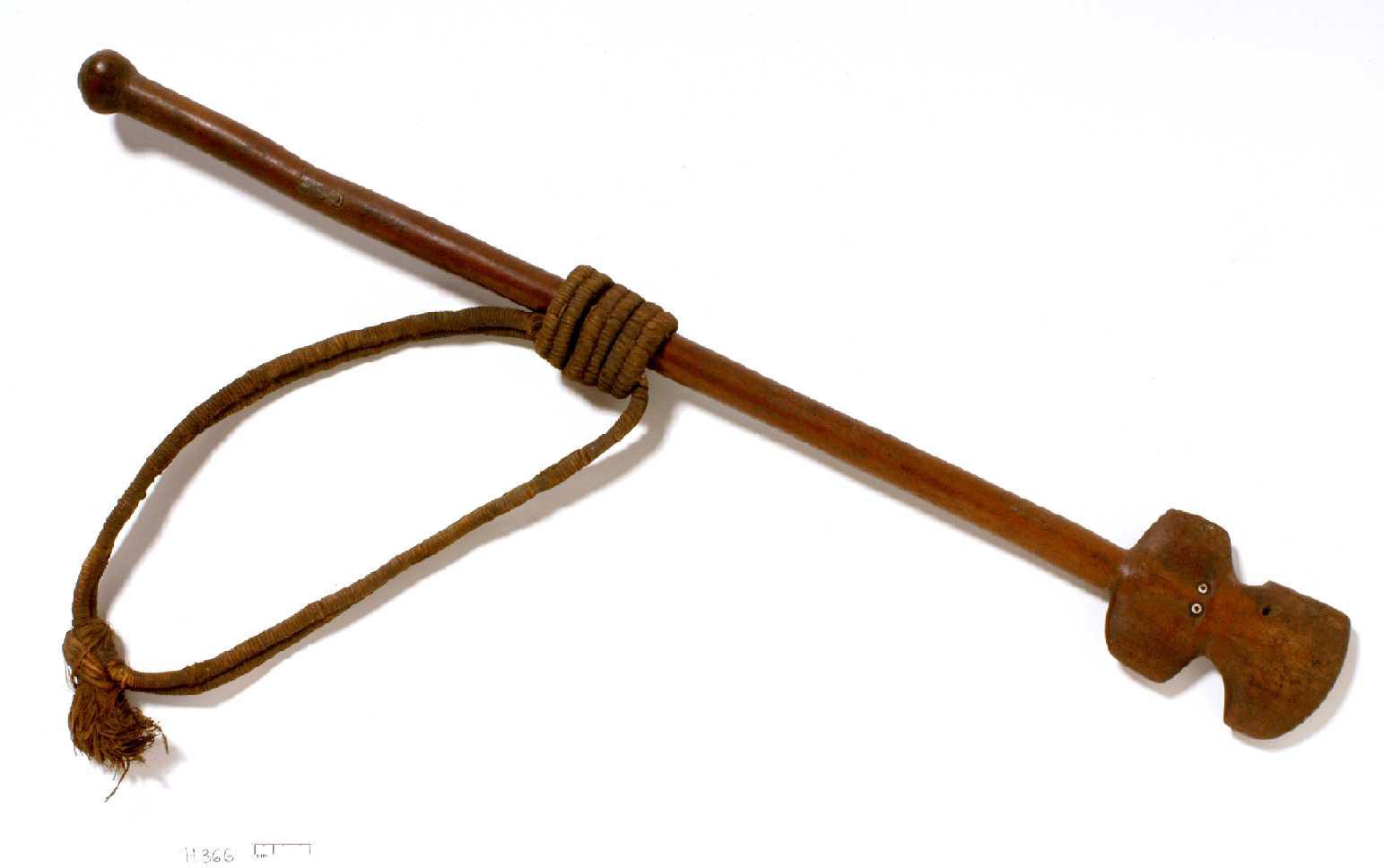
H000366- Club
