= ʻAhu ʻula =

Cloak of featherwork worn by men and women of high rank in Ancient Hawaii

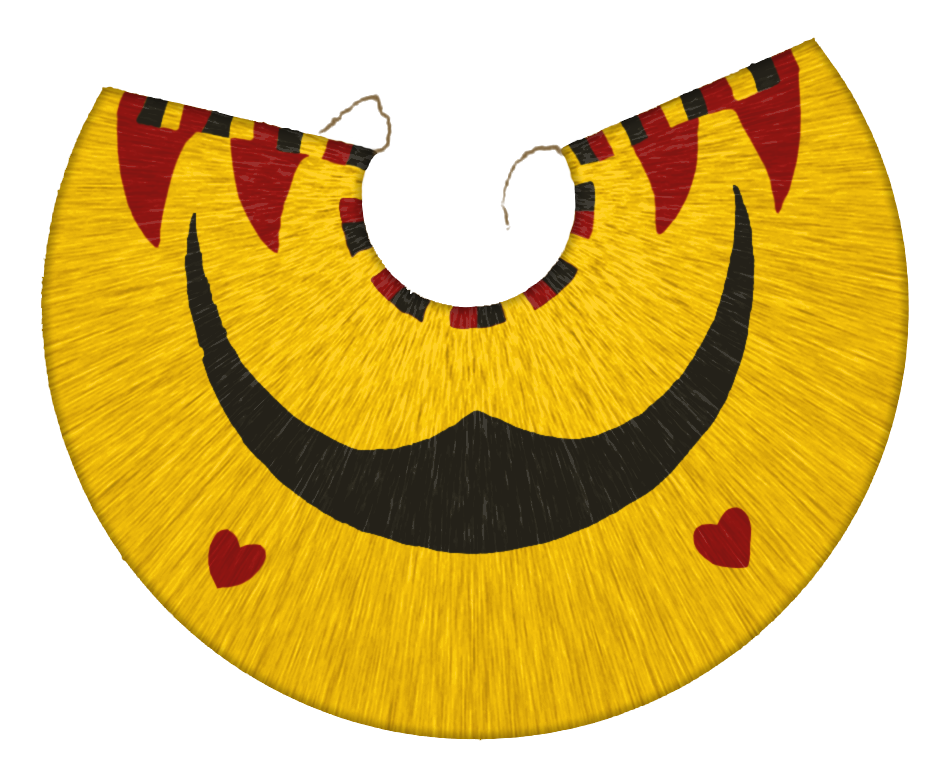
Haʻalelea's Feather Cape

The ʻahu ʻula (feather cape or cloak in the Hawaiian language, literally "red/sacred garment for the upper torso"), and the mahiole (feather helmet) were symbols of the highest rank of the chiefly aliʻi class of ancient Hawaii.

There are over 160 examples of this traditional clothing in museums around the world. At least thirty of these capes were collected during the voyages of Captain Cook, and sixteen survive.

These cloaks are made from a woven netting decorated with bird feathers and are examples of fine featherwork techniques.

== Privileges ==
The use of ʻahu ʻula cloaks/capes were restricted to aliʻi royals and high chiefs, generally speaking, though they could be conferred to warriors of special distinction. The feather helmet (mahiole) was a royal item as well. (Note: The use of mamo feathers was more restrictive, and at a minimum the kingship of an entire island had to be attained in order to use them.)

The size of the ʻahu ʻula was an indicator of rank. Some commentators distinguish the full-length ʻahu ʻula as "cloaks", extending from the neck to nearly the feet, and these were allowable only the highest-ranking elite, where as regular chiefs wore "capes" of lesser sizes. (Note: Force & Force (1968), which on p. 18 distinguishes "capes" as "short feather mantles or tippets", whereas "cloak" are "larger, longer garment".) Holt also makes such distinction, glossing ʻahuliʻī as "feather cape" (liʻī meaning "small") and ʻahuʻula as "feather cloak".

Some examples of ʻahu ʻula have been discussed as "war capes" (Cf. § War capes for specific examples, below).

The feathered cloaks and capes provided physical protection, and were believed to provide spiritual protection for their wearers. And conversely the mana (spiritual power) of the wearer will be imparted on the cape, and the father's mana can pass down to his heirs via the cape.

== Construction ==
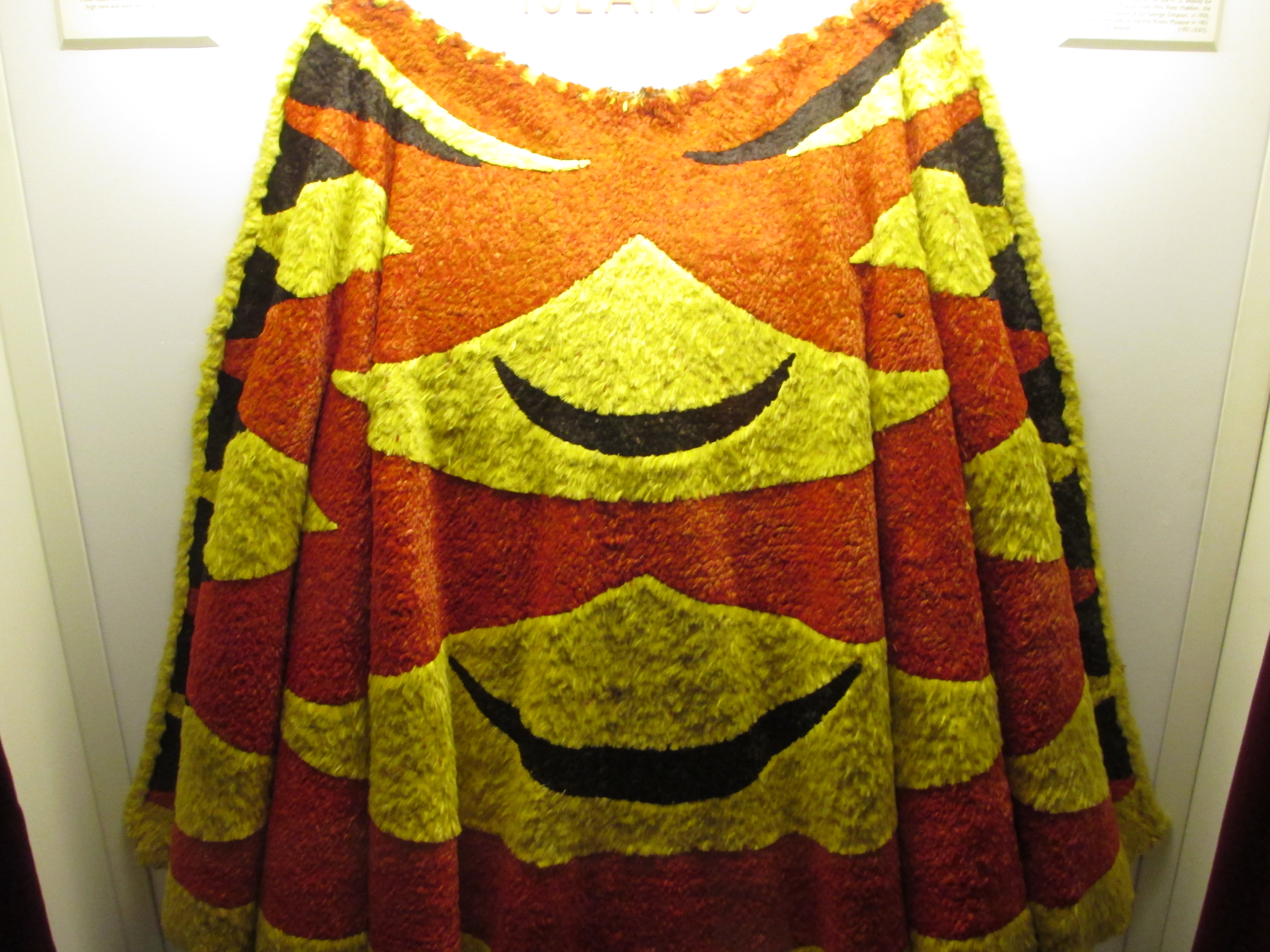
Feather Cloak of Princess Kekauluohi Kaʻahumanu —in the Pitt Rivers Museum, Oxford

The Hawaiian feather cloaks were decorated using yellow, red, sometimes black and green plumage taken from specific types of native birds (cf. § Bird feathers below).

The plant used to make the netting is olonā or Touchardia latifolia, a member of the nettle family (cf. § Early and later types).

Hundreds of thousands of feathers were required for each cloak. A small bundle of feathers (ʻuo or ʻuwo) was gathered and tied into the netting. Bundles were tied in close proximity to form a uniform covering of the surface of the cloak.

=== Bird feathers ===
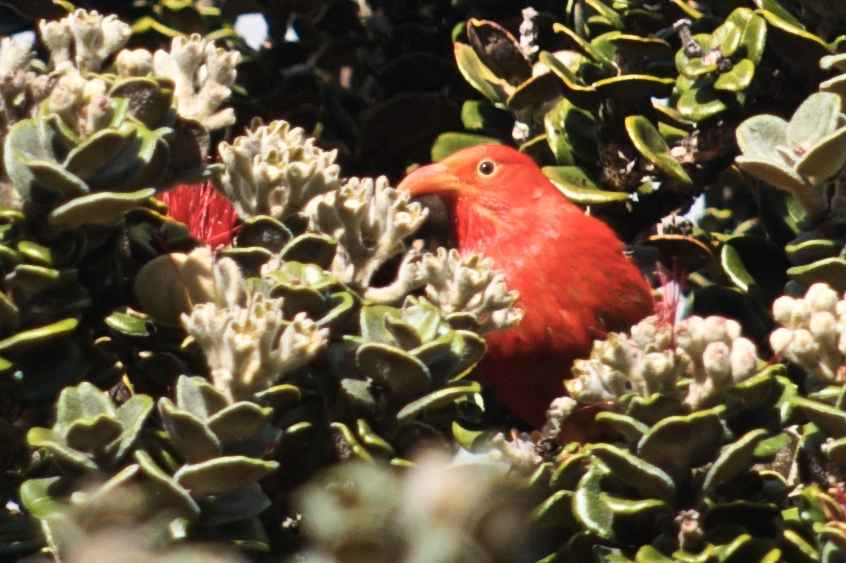
The ʻIʻiwi

Patches of yellow from certain mostly black birds (now all extinct species of the Hawaiian honeycreeper subfamily) were extracted, namely, from the ʻōʻō (Moho nobilis or generically the fours species of the genus) and mamo (Drepanis pacifica) using a catch and release philosophy due to their scarcity, to ensure future availability. The mamo feathers were described as yellow by some, or yellow tinged with orange by others and its use was restricted to not just royals, but a king of an entire island. Kamehameha I's vestment of pure mamo was dubbed "Golden Cloak" by some writers, but Brigham explains that the feathers from the mamo are actually orange, compared with ʻōʻō feathers which are "pale yellow", (Note: Or "bright yellow".) although fading cause the two types to appear both yellow and hard to distinguish. It has been suggested the combined use of yellow and red feathers was meant to simulate the royal orange of mamo plumage.

The scarlet and curve-beaked honeycreeper ʻiʻiwi (Vestiaria coccinea) was the main source of the distinctive red feathers, though the straight-beaked red honeycreeper ʻapapane (Himatione sanguinea) was also included. (Note: The feather items collected by Captain Cooke's voyagers were "almost invariably those of the ʻiʻiwi", but one exception employed patches of feathered skin, some belonging to ʻapapane.) Because of their comparative abundance (and since all of their feather could be used), these were traditionally killed and skinned.

The black feathers of the ʻōʻō were also used. There are only three green feather cloak specimens have been passed down. The endangered (or already extinct) ʻōʻū with its green plumage were used on some examples, though rarely. (Note: Cf. § Green cloak Brigham thought the mostly green Miller Christy cloak (which later went to Dresden) to be of ʻōʻū plumage.) The ʻakialoa (olim. Hemignathus procerus) may have also been the source of green feather. (Note: Brigham could not make up his mind whether the Hemignathus procerus or the ʻōʻū, Psittirostra psittacea provided the dark green feathers of the crescents and semi-crescents shapes on the so-called "Steen Bille cape, named after Steen Bille who obtained it in the 1845 voyage to Hawaii aboard the Galathea; the cape is housed by Denmark's National Museum in Copenhagen. Sarah Stone painted the H. procerus next to a green cape, cf. § Green cloak below.) David Malo (19th cent.) includes the amakihi bird referring to yellow-green birds of several species of honeycreepers. These were some of the birds whose "feathers were taken to fashion the gods, the helmets, cloaks and lei".

==== Conservation ====
While it was permissible to slaughter the red birds since the plumage of its whole body was useful, the black with yellow birds were protected by Kamehameha I who commanded that these be captured alive and then released after harvesting the yellow feathers. By the 19th century, however, this kapu was suspected of not being strictly observed by all the native bird-catchers, and in fact, recorded as being eaten for food.

The Hawaii mamo became extinct around the end of the 19th century, and the black mamo last collected in 1907. Henshaw suspected the rapid decline was due to increased use of shotgun over traditional methods of bird-catching using snares and birdlime (cf. Hawaii mamo). All species of ʻōʻō had become extinct by 1987, with the probable cause being disease.

Both the red species can still be found in Hawaii, but in much reduced numbers, due to various causes, and exploitation of feather is thought by some to be minimal effect on population decline.

=== Early and later types ===
Early feathered capes used coarse netting as foundation, first covered by larger but drab-colored feathers (white, black, brown, form chicken or jungle fowl and other birds), atop which decorative feathers were mounted. Later, closer-plaited (hand-knotted) meshes were developed to be used as base, to which the prized feathers could be attached directly. The fine mesh were known as nae (or naepuni or puni), and woven from olonā fiber. Also the shape evolved from rectangular to circular, but all the known rectangular specimens (including the "war capes" discussed above) are held outside of Hawaii. The circular type may have developed in Hawaii due to foreign (non-Polynesian) influence. (Note: Cf. Māori feather cloaks whose known examples are rectangular.)

Also, early types of Hawaiian feather cloaks were rectangular, though none of the surviving examples remained in Hawaii and have been kept elsewhere, so that only the later circular forms became generally family to the Hawaiian populace. (Note: Māori rectangular robes remain in New Zealand, as Hiroa notes.) These early type small capes or rectangular ʻahu ʻula include § War capes types, below.

The earlier types lumped together as "rectangular" by Hiroa (aka Buck, 1944, 1957) were later subdivided into the "trapezoidal" type vs. "straight collar with shaped bottom" type by Kaeppler (1985).

== Captain James Cook collection ==
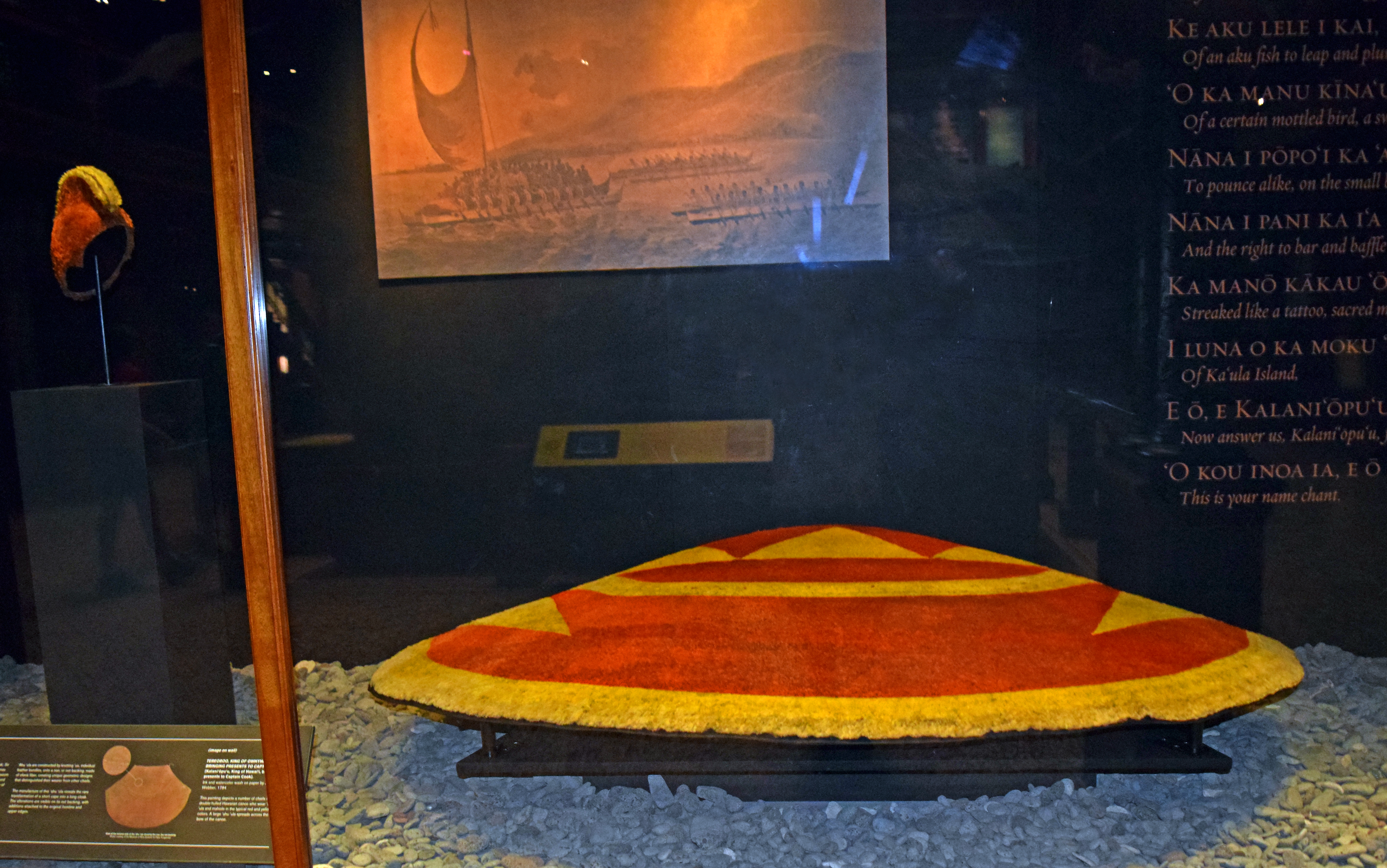
The feather cape given to Captain Cook on display at the Bishop Museum, Honolulu, Hawaiʻi

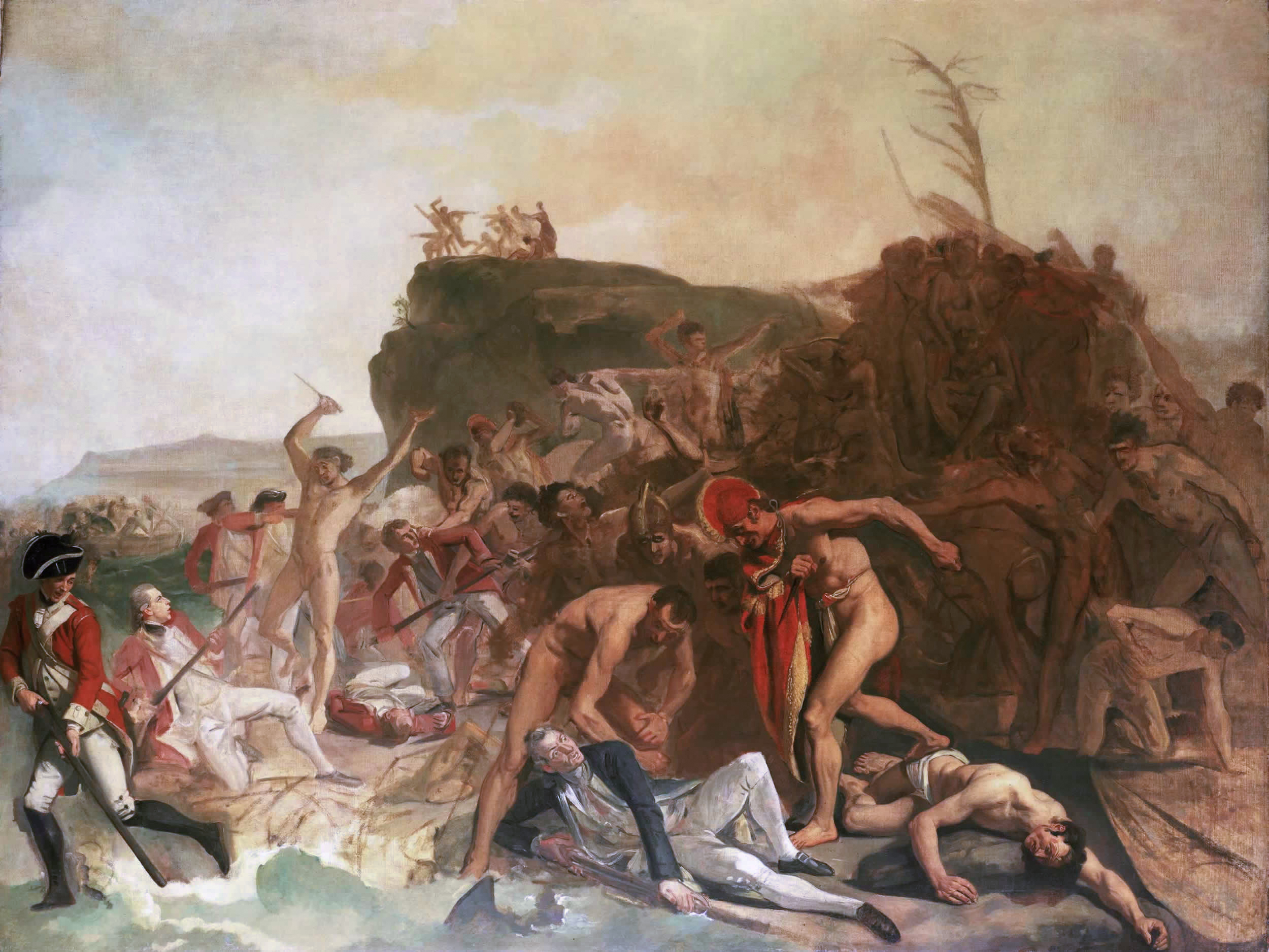
The Death of Captain James Cook —Oil painting, Johann Zoffany (c. 1795), 137.2 cm × 182.9 cm, National Maritime Museum

The Third voyage of James Cook (during which James Cook was killed in Hawaii) acquired a number of featherworks, which mostly remained together in the Leverian collection for a time, but later dispersed in sales and auctions, into the hands of private collectors. Some eventually were donated over to non-private museums. Other examples are presumed lost.

=== Cloaks and helmet given him to wear, 1779 ===
When British explorer James Cook visited in Hawai‘i on 26 January 1779 he was received by a high chief Kalaniʻōpuʻu of Hawaii Island. At the end of the meeting Kalaniʻōpuʻu made the gift of the feather helmet (mahiole) and feather cloak he was wearing by placing them personally upon Cook's head and shoulders, and making him clutch his kāhili ("fan", "fly flap") which was a symbol of authority. Kalaniʻōpuʻu also laid several other cloaks at Cook's feet as well as four large pigs and other offerings of food. (Note: Cook's Journal, [26] January 1779: "Terreeoboo (=Kalaniʻōpuʻu, king of Owhyhee)rose up, and.. threw over the Captain's shoulders the cloak he himself wore, put a feathered helmet on his head, and a curious fan into his hand. He also spread at his feet five or six other cloaks..")

This set of mahiole and cloak given by the Hawaii Island chief to Cook entered the Leverian collection, and continued to be showcased under glass "Case B" in the under Parkinson's ownership at Albion Street, (Note: Thomas (2016), pp. 81–82, citing A Companion to the Museum (Late Sir Ashton Lever's) Removed to Albion Street, the Surry End of Black Friars Bridge (London, 1790), p. 18) i.e., the rotunda building at the south end of the Blackfriars Bridge.

The Leverian collection was liquidated in 1806 (cf. § Leverian collection), and Hawaiian objects entered Bullock's collection (cf. § Bullock Museum), thence, the featherworks, etc., were purchased by Charles Winn on 7 May 1819. Of these, the cape and cloak "worn by Capt. Cook" were marked lot 34. In 1912, these items were donated by Winn's grandson Rowland Winn, 2nd Baron St Oswald, (Note: The Bullock Museum displayed a most black feather cloak "touching to the feet" labeled "A", "red feather cloak" labeled "B" and a "red feather helmet" labeled "C" according to an 1811 edition of his Companion pamphlet). The "red" was probably from the Cook voyage, though only a small one, matching with Bullocks purchase from the 1806 Leverian sales of "lot 4351, 'Small scarlet feather cloak'" (and two other cloaks plus necklaces) for which he paid ℒ1.16.0. The three cloaks in the lot, Kaeppler thinks, are the three cloaks illustrated (the ones dated 1783) by Sarah Stone.) who endowed them to the Dominion Museum of Wellington, New Zealand, precursor to the Museum of New Zealand Te Papa Tongarewa, and these (museum numbers FE 327 and FE 328) were repatriated to Hawaii as of March 2016, on a long-term loan basis, into the custody of the Bishop Museum.

It is also pointed out that actually Kalaniʻōpuʻu gave Cook the cloak he was wearing on two occasions, and the so-called Elgin Cloak is also alleged to have belonged to that chief. (Note: The Elgin Cloak was purchased by the Bishop Museum in 1968.)

=== Green cloak ===
A green cloak from the expedition has attracted curiosity not just for its color, but from the anecdote regarding its acquisition. The Hawaiian who owned it did not readily agree to trade it for various items offered as barter, but when he set eyes on a bottle and basin of the "Queen's ware" series of Wedgwood, he threw down the cape and made off with the porcelainware.

The subsequent provenance of this cloak has been traced, from the Leverian; after changing hands "Miller Christy of Chelmsford, Essex" loaned it to the British Museum for a while, then it went to the Museum für Völkerkunde, Dresden, but its fate became unknown after being sequestered during World War II. (Note: Sarah Stone also painted a mostly green cloak, next to the bird that provided its plumage. Force & Force (1968), pp. 50–51 describes the painting as that of the bird, probably the ʻakialoa (Hemignathus procerus) "with the predominately green cloak which features a large 'V' of contrasting red feathers".)

=== Leverian collection ===
Much of the material from Cook's voyages including the helmet and cloak ended up in the collection of Sir Ashton Lever. He exhibited them in his museum, the Holophusikon, including Kalaniʻōpuʻu's cape and helm.

Sarah Stone (later Mrs. Smith) had illustrated some 54 featherwork objects from the Leverian collection, but the whereabouts of only 10 of these items could be confirmed by 1968. Of these, there were 7 feather cloaks (the longer ʻahu ʻula (Note: Pratt's that "Kaeppler speculates that only about seven" ʻahu ʻula were collected by Cook's voyage, equal to the number painted by Stone, is confusing, but he must mean 7 "cloaks" of the longer type, since he goes on to say "about 20 capes" were collected by Cook, followed by the explanation that more varieties of birds were used for the capes.)) which she painted.

Lever went bankrupt and his collection was disposed of by public lottery. The collection was obtained by James Parkinson who continued to exhibit it "on Albion Street on the Surrey end of Blackfriars Bridge", i.e., in the "Sandwich Room" of the Blackfriars Rotunda, at the south end of Blackfriars Bridge). (Note: Cf. William Skelton's engraving) He eventually sold the collection in 1806 in 7,000 separate sales.

=== Bullock Museum ===
Certain featherwork items from the Leverian were purchased by William Bullock for his Bullock Museum. The "red feather cloak" was apparently only a small one, though probably from the Cook voyage, obtained from the Leverian sale of 1806. The item is added to the Companion guide to the museum in its 1807 edition. The Bullock also acquired a red feather cloak and helmet from Rev. Adam Clarke, but the original provenance of these is unclear.

Two sets of feather cape/cloak and helm were sold from the Bullock's collection to Charles Winn, eventually to enter the New Zealand national museum collection, namely, lot 25, probably those listed in the 1805 edition of the Companion to Bullock's Museum, but not associated with Cook's voyage, still retained at Te Papa, and the aforementioned lot 34, museum numbers FE 327 and FE 328 "worn by Cook".

=== Artistic depictions ===
Aside from Sarah Stone's paintings of the artefacts and birds, a number of portraitures from Cook's voyage depict feather cloaks, including artwork from artists who were part of the crew, and engravings based on such paintings.

Attached with the fame and heroization of Capt. Cook the person are a series of depictions of the Death of Cook, e.g., by eyewitness John Webber (oil, watercolor; also engraving based on latter), by John Cleveley who accompanied the voyage but was not at the scene, and oil painting by the German Johann Zoffany. (Note: Kaeppler has ventured that the cape (and mahiole helmet[?]) that Zoffany painted matches the item[s] in the aforementioned Kalaniʻōpuʻu cape (="Wellington" cape accord. Brigham (1918), pp. 41–42), but other sources merely remark that the contemporary viewership of Zoffany's art could have gone to a real feather cape in the Leverian. While another source remarked Zoffany merely depicted "sucha a helmet" as the engraving ("A Man of the Sandwich Islands, with his Helmet", below).)

These artists all depicted Hawaiian warriors clad in feather capes, some wearing helmet.

Another example is "A Man of the Sandwich Islands, with his Helmet" (engraving by John Keyse Sherwin, after Webber's painting, 1778–1784) which has been identified as Kanaʻina (Kalaimanokahoʻowaha), who was killed during the altercation.

== ʻAhu ʻula in current museums ==
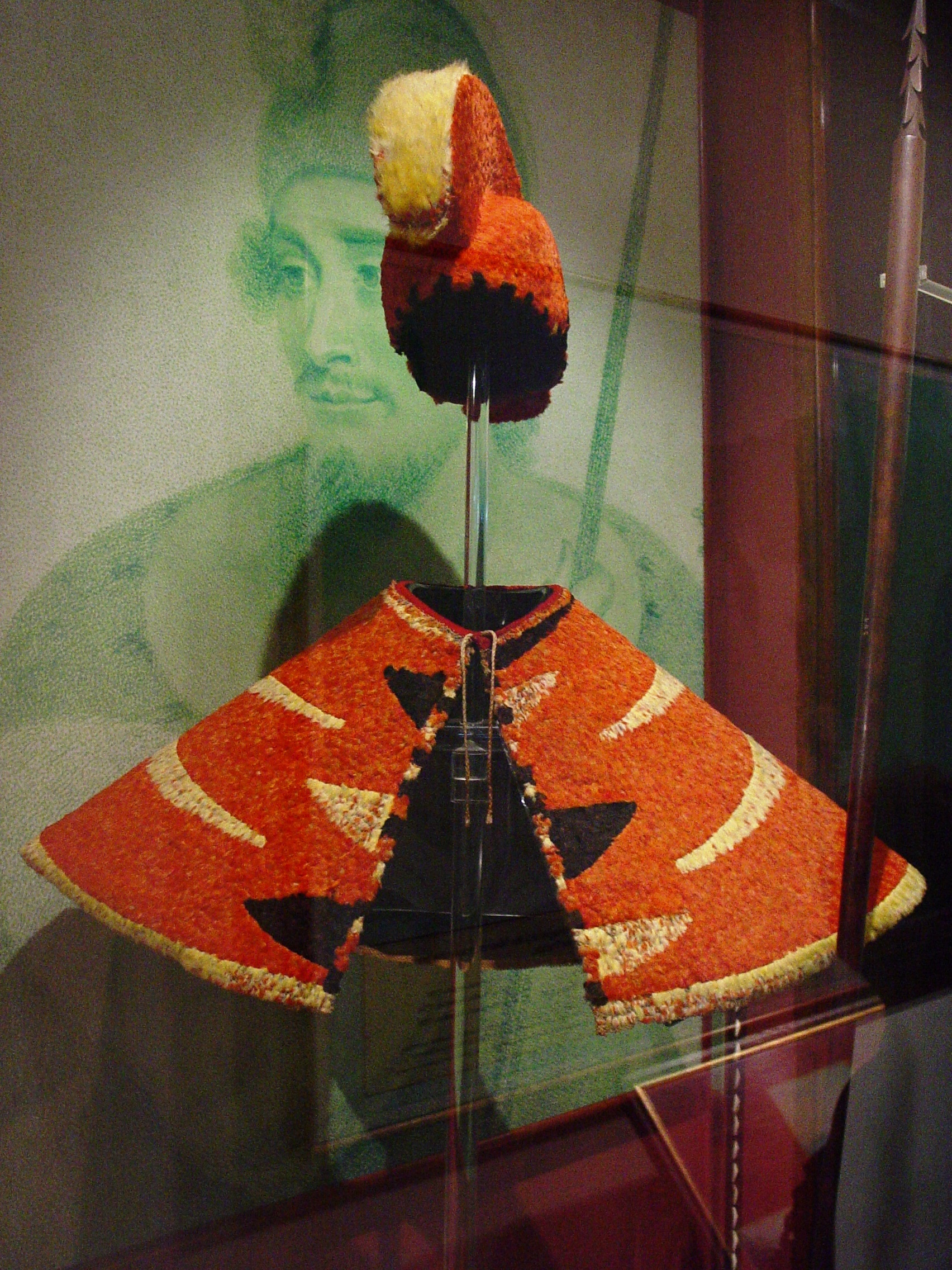
A red ʻahuʻula dubbed "Kekaulike cape" and mahiole. (Note: The cape of this design can be matched with "Kekaulike cape" described by Bishop (1918), etc.) (Note: The cape was given by Lot (Kamehameha V) in 1857 to E. Faulkner and bought back by Kapiʻolani in 1887 in her visit to England. She dubbed it the "Kekalulike Nui" cape but the personage referenced is unclear. Brigham notes it could be the king of Maui, or a female chiefess of that name. Kapiʻolani's own mother was named Kinoiki Kekaulike. The exhibit at Bishop matches it to a mahiole with a blow-up of the engraved portrait of Kaʻiana in the background.) ―Bishop Museum, in Oahu, Hawaii

The Bishop Museum in Honolulu in 1918 was in possession of some fifteen ʻahu ʻula, (Note: Brigham (1899), p. 56 list of 100 ʻahu ʻula was later revised in Brigham (1918), p. 39 to a list of 117 worldwide, of which 1–16 are at the Bishop Museum, but includes 1 pāʻū; 6 are "cloaks" the rest are "capes"; two malo (loincloths) also appear in the list, as No. 99, 101. Hiroa (1944), p. 3 says there are 10 cloaks.) (Note: The aforementioned Kalaniʻōpuʻu cloak which arrived in Bishop Museum from New Zealand in 2016 being a loan, not an acquisition.) including the magnificent full-length cloak of King Kamehameha, made entirely of mamo feathers (450,000 feathers from 80,000 birds.), though some i'iwi red feathers were added to the trimming later when Kamehameha IV wore it ceremonially.

The feather cloak of Kīwalaʻō is another item at the Bishop of special provenance. It belonged to Kīwalaʻō, son of the Kalaniʻōpuʻu (aforementioned as the gift-giver to Captain Cook) and Beaglehole claims it was what Kīwalaʻō wore when Captain Cook was killed. Kīwalaʻō was later killed by Kamehameha I who then obtained the cloak.

From Scotland, the aforementioned Elgin Cloak was obtained from the Burce family (surname of the Lords of Elgin, cf. Edward Bruce, 10th Earl of Elgin) in March 1968 by the Bishop Museum. And the so-called "Kintore Cloak" which was in Scotland was repatriated and donated to the Bishop Museum in 1969. This type featuring narrow horizontal types as these is "exceedingly rare", since the usual motif elements are lozenges, crescents, etc., and while a red and yellow striped cloak was painted by Sarah Stone, its whereabouts are unknown. The Kintore example has black stripes (prodigious use of black being rare in itself), which also makes it unique.

The Bishop also houses a mahiole and cloak (cape) given to the king of Kauaʻi, Kaumualiʻi, when he became a vassal to Kamehameha I in 1810, thus completing the unification of all the islands into the Hawaiian Kingdom. The mahiole is of primarily of red color, with some yellow feather used. The cloak was chiefly yellow with red feathers. There were actually several cloaks given on the 1810, and the Kaumualiʻi had entrusted his mahiole and 2 capes to a Mrs. Whitney. One cape was later purchased by the Bishop (then catalogued B 130), the other later went to the Kapiolani estate. Both are yellow ʻōʻō (base) and red ʻiʻiwi capes.

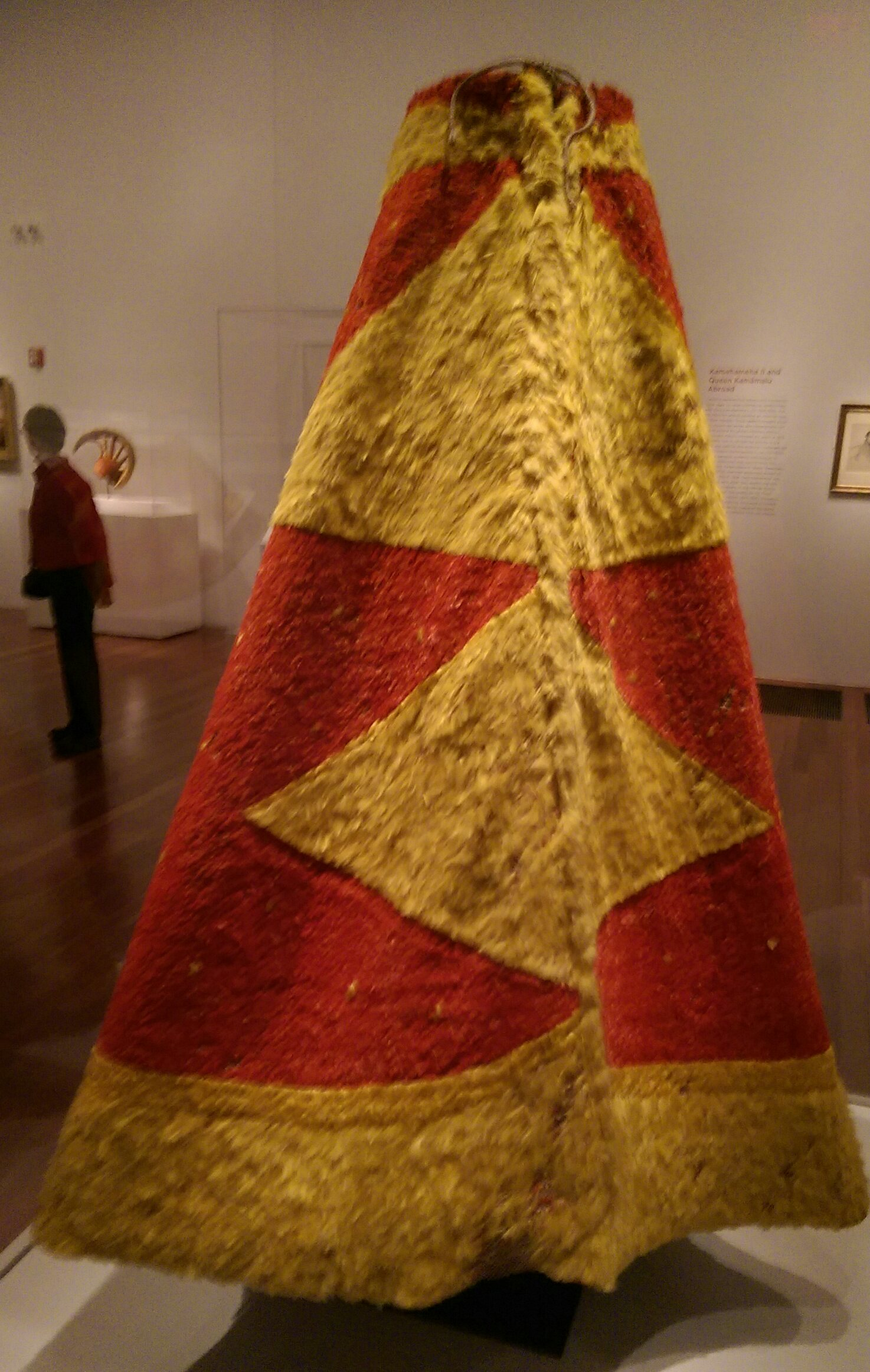
ʻahu ʻula associated with Kalaniʻōpuʻu —2015–16 exhibit at de Young Museum, San Francisco.

The de Young Museum in San Francisco displayed several cloaks in a special exhibition in 2015–2016, in collaboration with the Bishop Museum (cf. fig. above), with capes on loan from other institutions as well.

=== War capes ===
As already noted, the early small capes or the "rectangular" style capes are all housed in collections outside Hawaii.

Those examples classed as shorter ʻahu ʻula for combat, i.e., "war capes" include for example a cape from the Cook expedition held by the Australian Museum in Sydney. There are four similar "war capes" in the British Museum. (Note: The other "war capes" named by Brigham (1918), pp. 12–13 are a cape at Leyden, No. 64 and another at the Peabody Essex Museum of Salem, Mass., No. 94. Hiroa (1944), pp. 4–5 identifies the Vienna cape with exposed netting (Pl. 8, 9; cf. Hellmich (2015), Fig. 10 in full colour) as a war cape, citing Brigham (1918)) (Note: A man wears what Hiroa asserts to be a "war cape" in John Webber's etching "An inland view, in Atooi (Kauai Island)" in Capt. Cooke (King's) A voyage to the Pacific Ocean, Atlas of Plates volume, Pl. 35. A replica by William Hodges can be seen here.)

=== Further examples ===
The National Museums of Scotland show a feather cloak that was given in 1824 from King Kamehameha II of Hawaii to Frederick Gerald Byng thanking for his service in London. (Note: The gift was transformed into "feather breeches" in an 1824 lampoon cartoon by Isaac Robert Cruikshank, seen here. The name "Bynge" can be read on a yellow band by the gentleman's foot.)

The Te Papa in New Zealand, besides the aforementioned ʻahu ʻula (FE 327) moved to the Bishop Museum, (Note: The twice aforementioned Kalaniʻōpuʻu cloak now on long-term loan to Hawaii's Bishop Museum, as of 2016.) and the other cape (FE 326) houses a third cape, primarily black, bordered with red and yellow, also presented as gift from Lord St Oswald in 1912. The black feathers represented as belonging to the "powhee" bird (wild turkey?) in older documents (Note: Description of lot 27,) have been reassessed as black chicken feathers.

Auckland War Memorial Museum acquired a cloak for its collection in 1948.

Musée d'ethnographie de Genève displays an early 19th-century cloak on its permanent exhibition. It was considered the museum's most precious item by the institution's founder, Eugène Pittard.

== Anecdotes ==
=== Kalākaua ===
King David Kalākaua as rightful heir inherited the mamo feather cloak of Kamehameha I, and he used it in his coronation ceremonies held nine years into his reign, in 1883.

Earlier, King Kalākaua had taken an heirloom feather cloak (though it is not clear which one) to his trip around the world. But he was advised against wearing it himself, as it would be cumbersome to combine formal Western attire with the cloak. Consequently, the king's valet Robert was appointed to be the one to wear the cloak. Robert von Oehlhoffen was a German baron-turned-cook, hired as the king's chef and accompanied him on the tour as valet. (Note: Armstrong in the original edition refers to him as "von O".) During the group's stay in Tokyo, Robert was given permission to wear the feather cloak with specific instructions not to make any semblance of him being a royal, still nevertheless confusing the Japanese contingent to imagine he was a man of high stature. Robert was afterwards caught drunk and asleep on the sofa of the king's bedroom, wearing the cloak. The cloak was one worn by his predecessors, and Kalākaua refused the suggestion of giving away the heirloom cloak to the Emperor of Japan as a return gift.

The office of "Groom of the Feather Cloak" was one that "never previously existed", perhaps one he devised himself and "assumed", (Note: Whereas a kāhili bearer was an actual position, with "royal standard" being the Englished term for kāhili even in a book authored by Kalākaua. However it is unclear if Armstrong refers to any kāhili to the trip, since he only repeated refers to "royal standard" in the sense of a flag hoisted up the main mast of their ship) Robert re-assumed the role of the feather cloak keeper when the king was visiting the maharaja of Johore, but he again got drunk and returned from a luggage-trip to the yacht without the cloak, thus removed from his office a second time.

== See also ==
- feather cloak#Hawaii
- kāhili – Symbol of the aliʻi chiefs and families of the Hawaiian Islands
- mahiole – Hawaiian ceremonial headdress
- Nāhiʻenaʻena's pāʻū – Largest known Hawaiian feather cloak or skirt
