= Mahiole =

Hawaiian ceremonial headdress

Hawaiian feather helmet
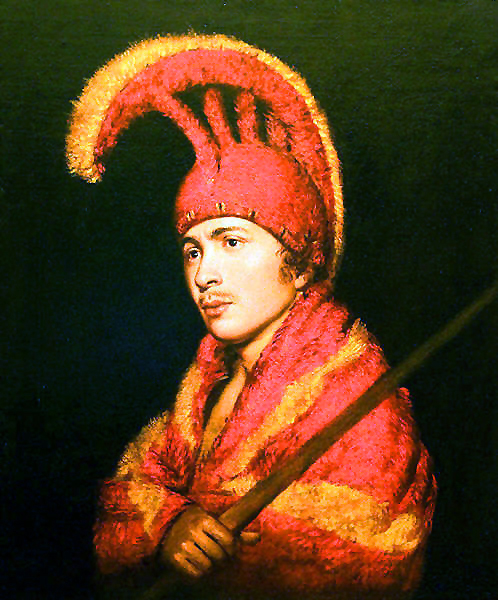
- Man Wearing Feather Cloak and Helmit (sic) attributed to Rembrandt Peale.
- Material: Feathers and plant fibres
- Created: 18th century
- Present location: various museums including the British Museum, London

Hawaiian feather helmets, known as mahiole in the Hawaiian language, were worn with feather cloaks (ʻahu ʻula). These were symbols of the highest rank reserved for the men of the aliʻi, the chiefly class of Hawaii. There are examples of this traditional headgear in museums around the world. At least sixteen of these helmets were collected during the voyages of Captain Cook. These helmets are made from a woven frame structure decorated with bird feathers and are examples of fine featherwork techniques. One of these helmets was included in a painting of Cook's death by Johann Zoffany.

== Appearance ==
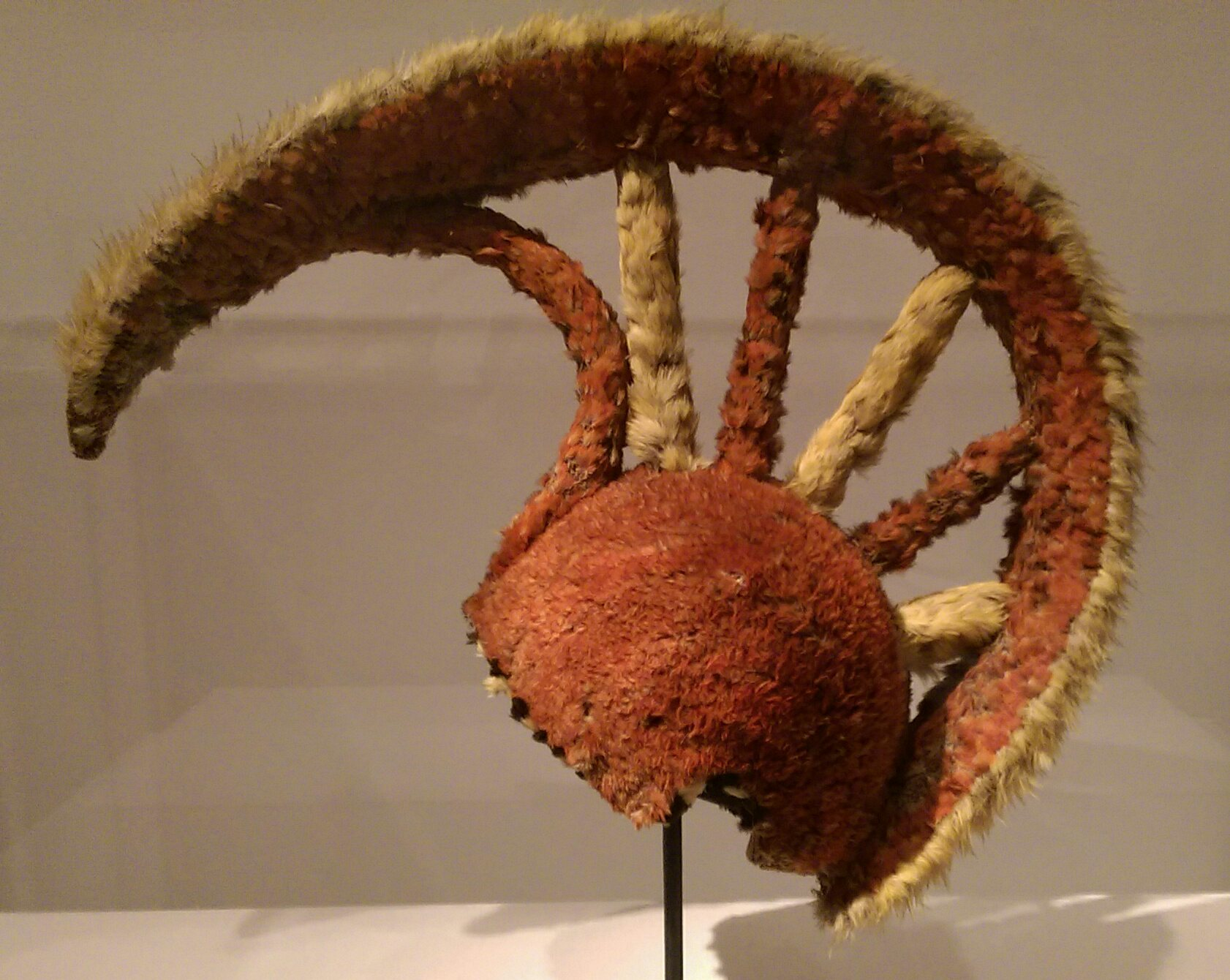
A Mahiole collected by Robert Gray in 1789

While the Hawaiians did not wear hats, during times of combat the Ali'i chiefs would wear specially created wicker helmets that have been likened to the classic Greek helmets, and also coincidentally bear a resemblance to the headdress worn by Ladakh Buddhist religious musicians. While the question has been posed if the influence is from the Spanish, the tradition comes from the northern coast of New Ireland. The design for mahiole is a basketry frame cap with a central crest running from the center of the forehead to the nape of the neck. However the variation in the design is considerable with the colour and arrangement of the feather patterns differing and the crest varying in height and thickness. A number of museums have numerous examples in different designs and stages of preservation. A related Hawaiian term Oki Mahiole means a haircut where a strip of hair is left on the head. The image of the Hawaiian god Kū-ka-ili-moku is sometimes presented with a similar shaped head.

== Construction ==
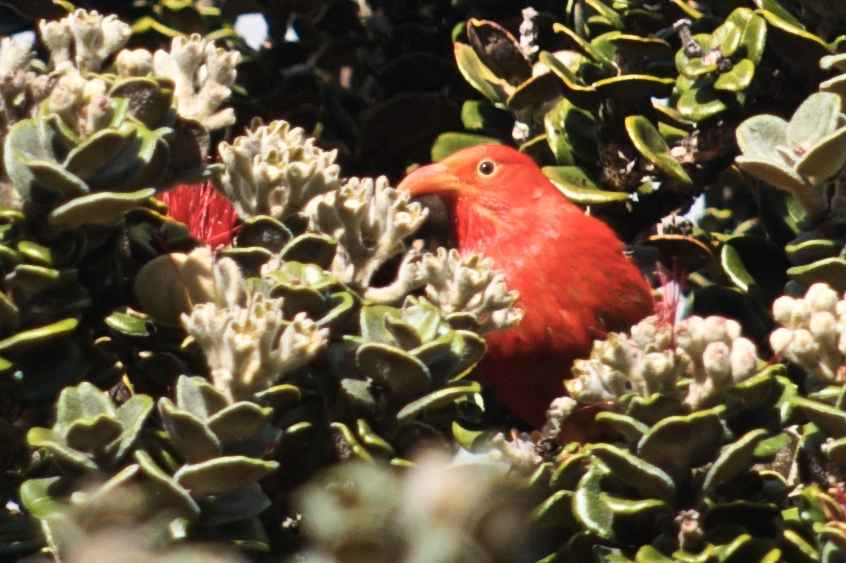
The Scarlet Hawaiian Honeycreeper or ʻIʻiwi.

The helmets are constructed on a basket type construction which gives a light and strong frame. The frame is decorated usually with feathers obtained from local birds although there have been variations which have used human hair instead. The plant used to make the baskets is Freycinetia arborea, a plant often used to make basketware. In addition to Freycinetia arborea the makers also used fibre from the Touchardia latifolia plant which is a type of nettle. Touchardia latifolia was used to create string or thread to tie the feathers to the basketry.

The colouring was achieved using different types of feathers. The black and yellow came from a bird called the "((Mamo))" Moho or "(('Ō'ō))" ʻOʻoin Hawaiian. There were four varieties of this bird. The last type became extinct in 1987 with the probable cause being disease. Black feathers were also sourced from the bird called the Mamo which is also now extinct. The distinctive red feathers came from the 'Ī'īwi and the 'Apapane. Both species are still moderately common birds in Hawaii. Although birds were exploited for their feathers the effect on the population is thought to be minimal

Specialist birdcatchers in the forests usually took the entire skin of the smaller ((" 'Ī'īwi")) or the ((" 'Apapane")), because their red feathers covered the bird and were quite small. These birds were eaten for sustinence in that harsh environment. Sometimes, in the moulting season, the ((Mamo)) and (( Ō'ō )) birds yielded plucked-out larger yellow feathers and the birds were then released*, but these larger birds were also valued for their smaller black feathers which mostly covered them, especially the (("'Ō'ō ")), which was a favorite food bird as well, so it is likely that few ((" 'Ō'o "))were released, as reported by a prominent author of two generations earlier with far more living sources of old time information.

Tens of thousands of feathers were required for each mahiole. A small bundle of feathers was gathered and tied before being tied into the framework. Bundles were tied in close proximity to form a uniform covering of the surface of the mahiole.

== Captain James Cook's mahiole ==
When Captain James Cook visited Hawaii on 26 January 1778 he was received by a high chief called Kalaniʻōpuʻu. At the end of the meeting Kalaniʻōpuʻu placed the feathered helmet and cloak he had been wearing on Cook. Kalaniʻōpuʻu also laid several other cloaks at Cook's feet as well as four large pigs and other offerings of food. Much of the material from Cook's voyages including the helmet and cloak ended up in the collection of Sir Ashton Lever. He exhibited them in his museum, initially called the Holophusikon and later the Leverian Museum. It was while at this museum that Cook's mahiole and cloak were borrowed by Johann Zoffany in the 1790s and included in his painting of the Death of Cook.

Lever went bankrupt and his collection was disposed of by public lottery. The collection was obtained by James Parkinson who continued to exhibit it. He eventually sold the collection in 1806 in 8,000 separate sales. (The British Museum failed to bid on these items as Sir Joseph Banks had advised them that there was nothing of value.). The mahiole and cloak were purchased by the collector William Bullock who exhibited them in his own museum until 1819 when he also sold his collection. The mahiole and cloak were purchased by Charles Winn and they remained in his family until 1912, when Charles Winn’s grandson, the Second Baron St Oswald, gave them to the Dominion of New Zealand. They are now in the collection of the Museum of New Zealand Te Papa Tongarewa.

== Mahiole in museums ==
=== Bernice P. Bishop Museum, Honolulu ===
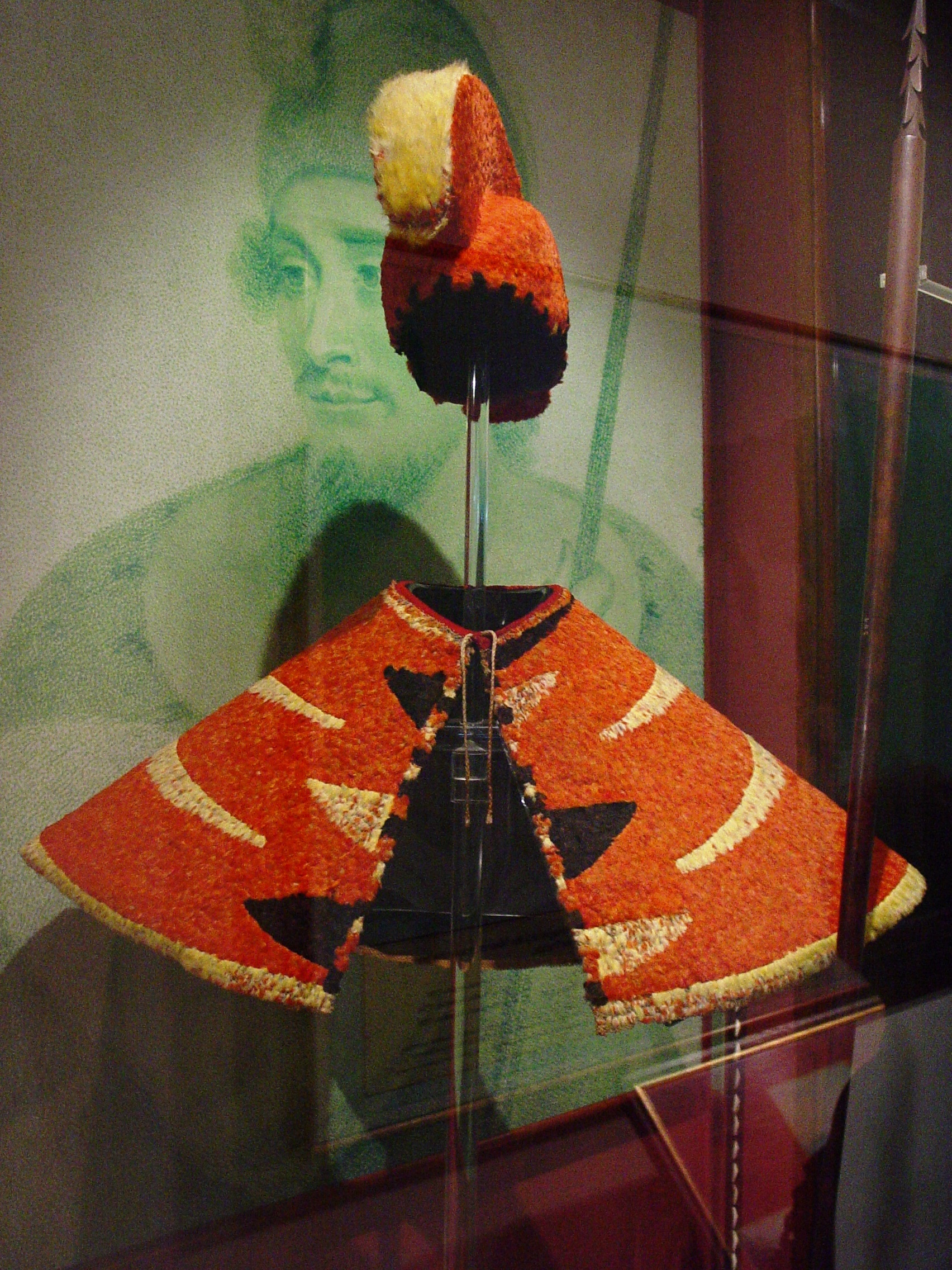
A 200-year-old Mahiole alongside a feathered cape.

The Bernice P. Bishop Museum in Honolulu has a 200-year-old mahiole and matching cloak. This bright red and yellow mahiole was given to the king of Kauaʻi, Kaumualiʻi, when he became a vassal to Kamehameha I in 1810, uniting all the islands into the Kingdom of Hawaii.

=== British Museum, London ===
The British Museum has seven of these helmets. The large red one pictured was obtained from the collection of Sir Joseph Banks. Banks was a rich polymath who was particularly interested in botany. He sailed with Captain Cook on his first journey of exploration and continued to keep in contact with Cook's further explorations. It is speculated that this helmet may have belonged to Cook's second in command, Charles Clerke. Clerke's collections were left to Joseph Banks following Clerke's death on Cook's third voyage. At the time of his death Clerke was captain of the vessel following Cook's death.

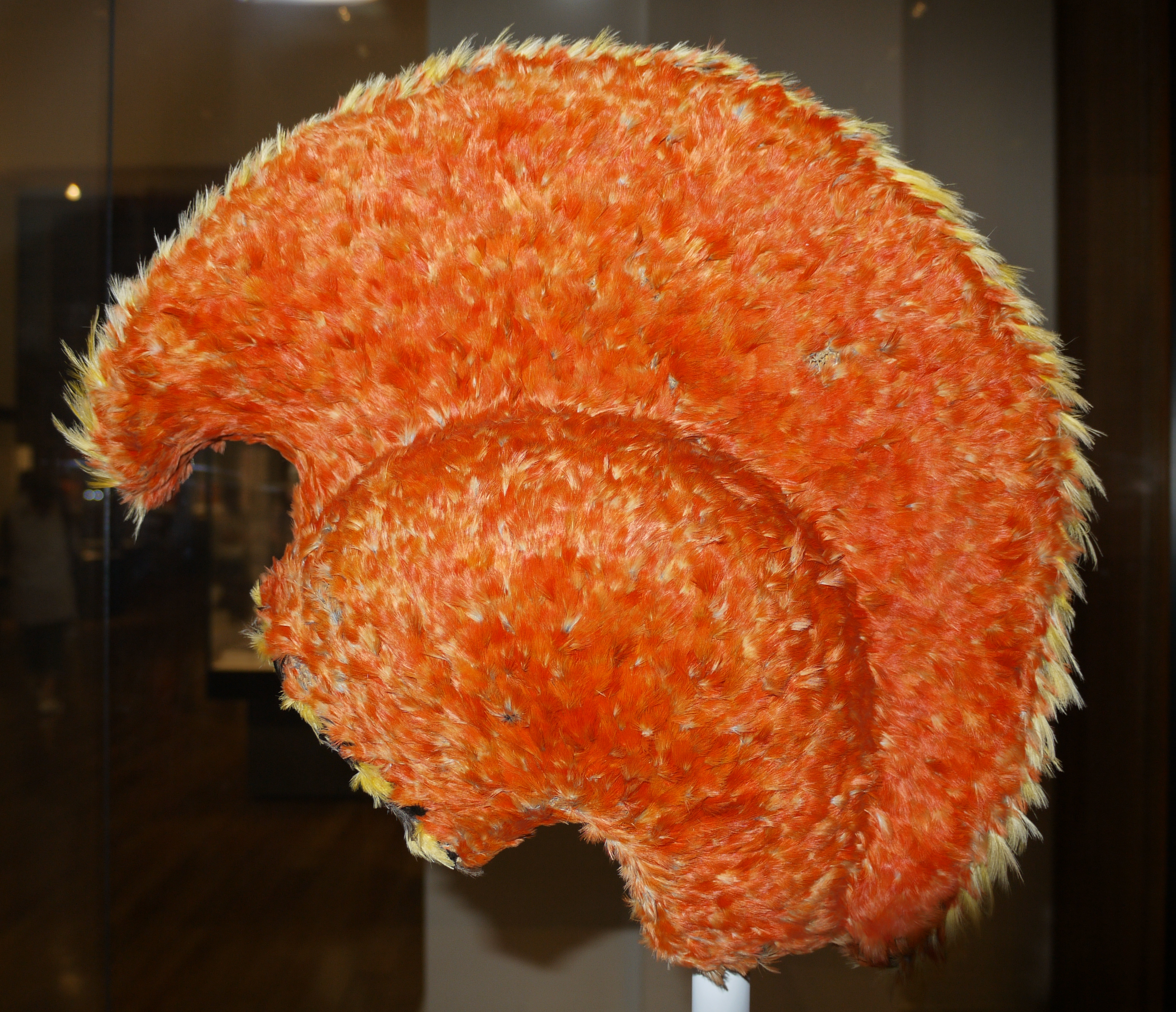
The red British Museum helmet.

A second helmet differs in overall design to the first in that it has concentric bands of yellow and black against an overall red background. A hat of this design was recorded by John Webber who was Captain Cook's official artist. The British Museum also holds an example without feathers which shows how the framework was constructed.

=== Museum of Ethnology, Vienna ===
The Museum of Ethnology in Vienna obtained some of its oldest exhibits from the Leverian Museum sale of 1806. Baron Leopold von Fichtel purchased a number of items for his museum in Vienna.

=== Museum of New Zealand Te Papa Tongarewa, Wellington ===
The Museum of New Zealand Te Papa Tongarewa has four mahiole in its collection. Two were gifts of Lord St Oswald in 1912. The other two were purchased in 1948 by the New Zealand Government from William Ockelford Oldman, a collector and dealer in ethnographic antiquities. The British Museum, The Smithsonian and the Museum of New Zealand Te Papa Tongarewa believe that one of the helmets and its matching cloak were those placed on Cook by the Hawaiian chief Kalani’ōpu’u. The particular helmet and cloak in question are similar to those depicted in Zoffany's painting.

== History of the World in 100 Objects ==
The feathered helmet from the British Museum was chosen to be one of the items featured in the radio series A History of the World in 100 Objects. The series started in 2010 and was created in a partnership between the BBC and the British Museum.

Preceded by 86: Akan Drum	A History of the World in 100 Objects; Object 87	Succeeded by 88: North American buckskin map

== Tales From Te Papa ==
Cook's mahiole and cloak are featured in the mini-documentary television series Tales from Te Papa filmed in 2009. The series was created in a partnership between TVNZ and Te Papa.
