= Surrey Institution =

Coordinates: 51.50791°N 0.10476°W

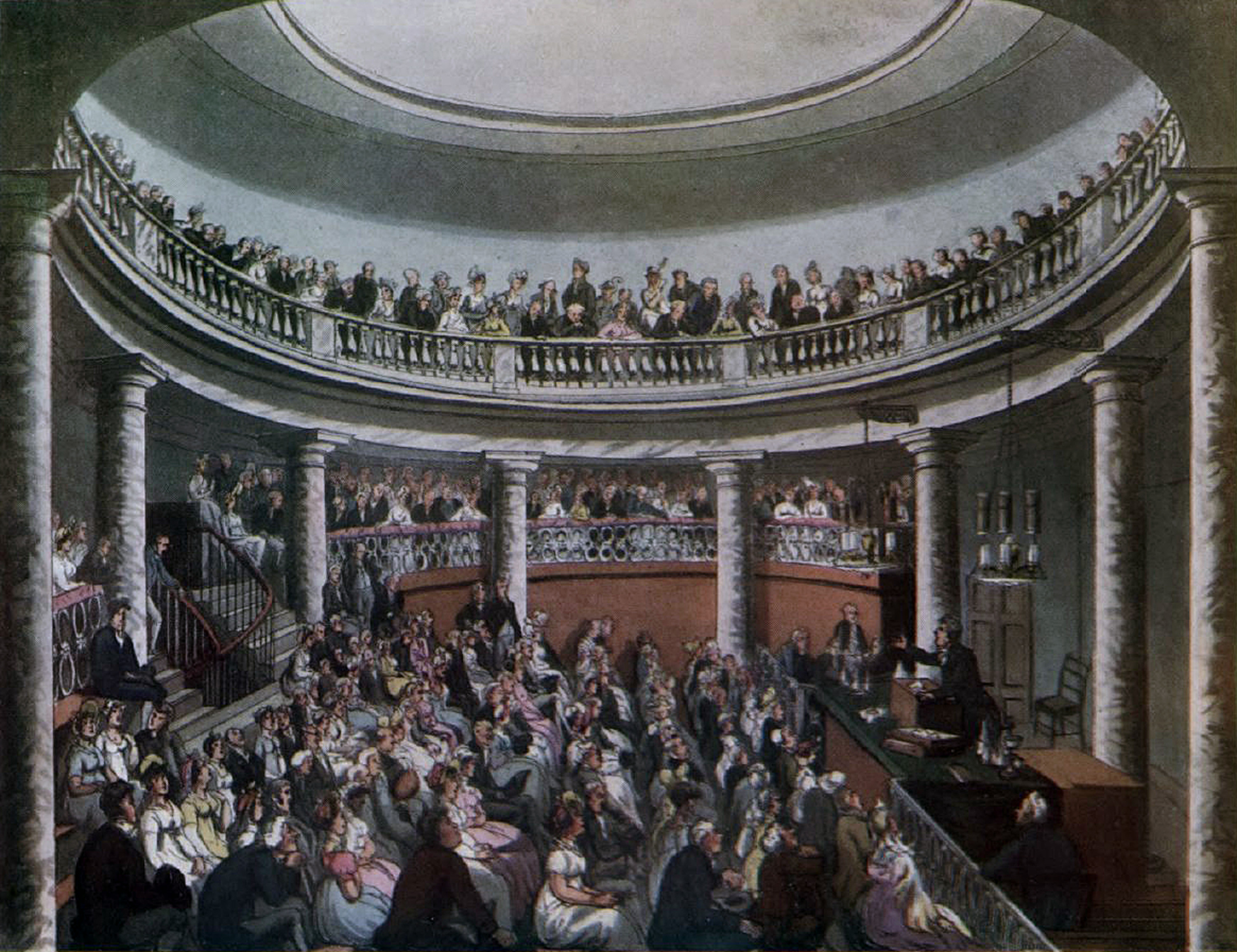
Lecture Hall of the Surrey Institution, c.1808, aquatint by Joseph Constantine Stadler

The Surrey Institution was an organisation devoted to scientific, literary and musical education and research, based in London. It was founded by private subscription in 1807, taking the Royal Institution, founded in 1799, as a model. The Institution lasted only until 1823, when it was dissolved. (A separate and distinct charity, The Surrey Institution was formed in 1812 with aims to discharge persons confined to gaol in the county for debt. The Surrey Literary, Scientific and Zoological Institution founded in 1831 by Edward Cross was unconnected, being a vehicle for the Royal Surrey Gardens.)

== History ==
Early meetings were held at the London coffee house on Ludgate Hill. The institution chose its name after a property convenient for its needs was found: the Rotunda Building on the south side of the Thames, at the time part of the county of Surrey.

The architect employed was Joseph T. Parkinson, son of James Parkinson who owned the Rotunda, opened in 1787. The building had been the final home of the Leverian Museum, housing the collection of Sir Ashton Lever, but had fallen into disrepair. The Institution renovated it to include a large lecture hall capable of accommodating 500 people, and a galleried library of 60 feet in length; it opened on 1 May 1808. Other facilities in the building included committee rooms; a library with lending facilities; a reading room, chemical laboratory and contemporary philosophical apparatus.

Costs were met by an initial 458 subscribers contributing thirty guineas each. The library had more than 5000 volumes by 1810.

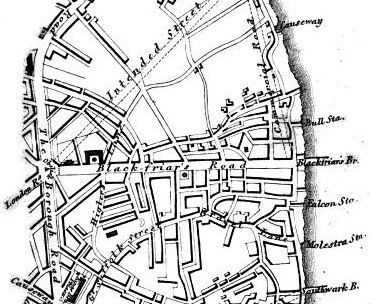
Area of Blackfriars Road in an 1817 map, oriented with west approximately at the top. The Rotunda was on the west side of the road, very close to the bridge.

== Staff ==
Adam Clarke was appointed Librarian in 1808, through the intervention of Joseph Butterworth, his connection by marriage (their wives were sisters). The appointment was not a great success, though Clarke resided at the Institution and wrote there. After ten months he resigned and refused the salary. He was given the title of Honorary Librarian. Thomas Hartwell Horne, on his own account, became sub-librarian in 1809, with the support of Clarke and Butterworth; elsewhere he is mentioned as Librarian in 1814. Horne's brother-in-law John Millard was assistant librarian in 1813.

After Clarke's resignation, Knight Spencer offered to act as Secretary, without salary but with the use of the librarian's apartment. He is recorded as Secretary in 1818.

== Surrey Institution lectures ==
The Institution offered members and visitors lectures on a variety of subjects, the earliest of which included chemistry, mineralogy and natural philosophy, given by employed and visiting scientists, scholars and artists. Samuel Taylor Coleridge, for instance, lectured on belles lettres in 1812–13; William Hazlitt, on the English Poets in 1817 and the English Comic Writers in 1818; Goldsworthy Gurney found employment there in 1822, and there devised an improved blowpipe for which he won some renown. Other lecturers included:

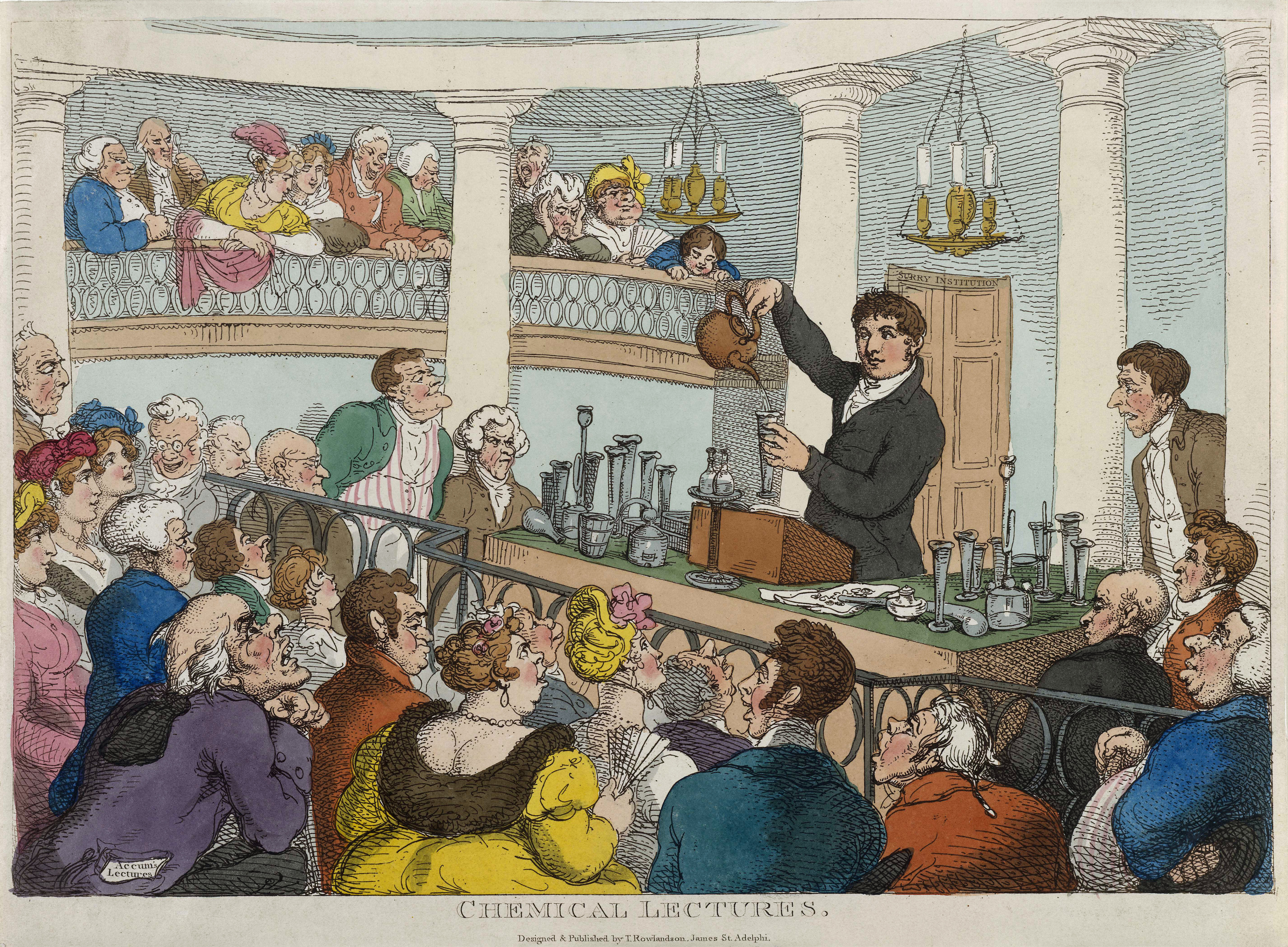
Satirical print by Thomas Rowlandson, Friedrich Christian Accum lectures at the Surrey Institution, about 1810.

- Friedrich Christian Accum, from 1809;
- Samuel Wesley, in 1809 and 1811.
- Gregor von Feinaigle, in 1811;
- John Mason Good in 1811–2;
- Olinthus Gilbert Gregory in 1812;
- John Landseer in 1813;
- John Murray in 1816.
- William Crotch in 1818.
- James Elmes, winter 1819–20.

== Related places ==
The Surrey Institution was one of four such notable organisations in London in the early nineteenth century; its model was the Royal Institution. The other two were:

- The London Institution (now defunct)
- The Russell Institution (now defunct)

Charles Lamb in a letter of about 1807–8 referred to four, though with the Southwark Institution for the Surrey, while alluding to "ten thousand" similar institutions.

== See also ==
- Rotunda radicals
