= Blackfriars Rotunda =

Building in Southwark, London

Coordinates: 51.50791°N 0.10476°W

The Blackfriars Rotunda was a building in Southwark, near the southern end of Blackfriars Bridge across the River Thames in London, that existed from 1787 to 1958 in various forms. It initially housed the collection of the Leverian Museum after it had been disposed of by lottery. For a period it was home to the Surrey Institution. In the early 1830s it notoriously was the centre for the activities of the Rotunda radicals. Its subsequent existence was long but less remarkable.

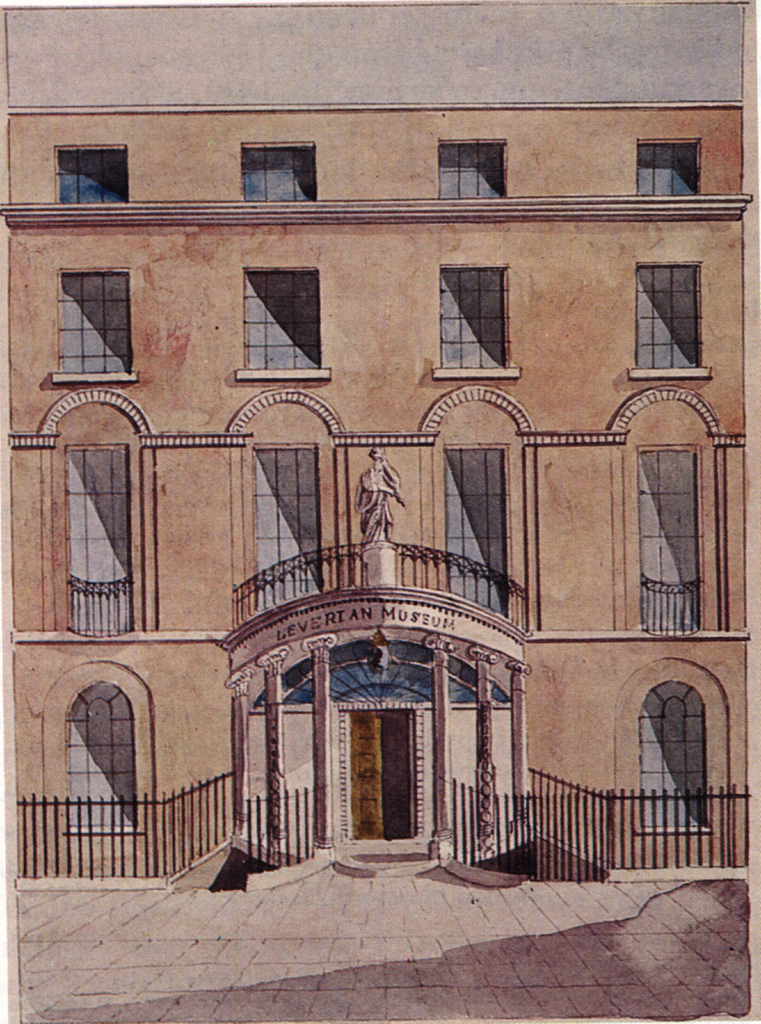
Street view of the Rotunda as Leverian Museum.

== James Parkinson and the Leverian collection ==
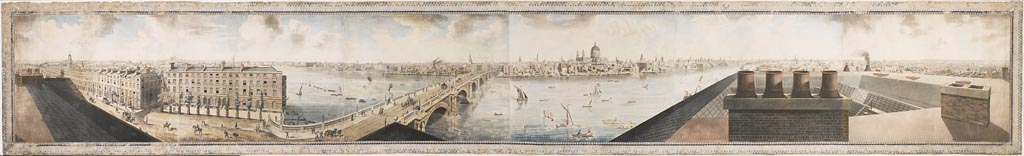
The environment of the Rotunda (in the terrace of houses partially hidden to the left end) is shown in this panorama of 1792, from the top of the nearby Albion Mills.

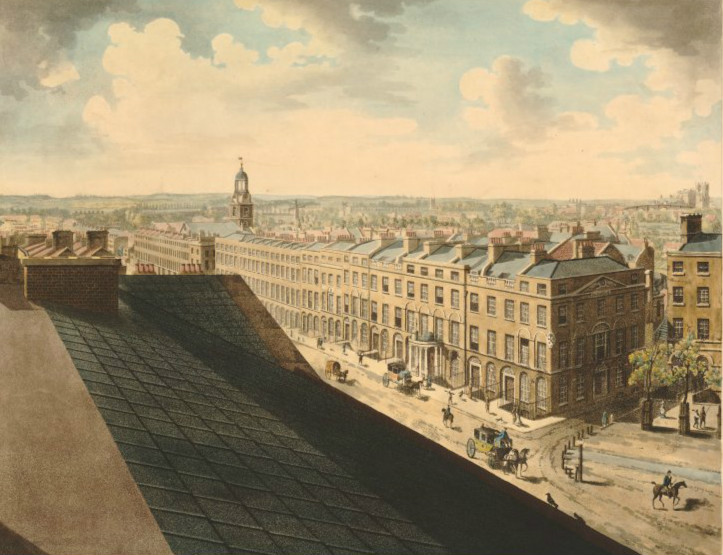
Panorama detail; the portico of the street entrance to the Rotunda stands out.

James Parkinson came into possession of the collection of Sir Ashton Lever quite by chance: Lever put it up as a lottery prize, Parkinson's wife bought two tickets, gave one away, and died before the time the lottery draw was carried out.

=== Construction of the Rotunda ===
After trying to run the museum in its old location in Leicester Square, but finding the rent too much, Parkinson with other investors put up the Rotunda Building; it was of his own design (along with his architect son Joseph Parkinson), was constructed by James Burton, and was opened in 1787.

The Rotunda building had a central circular gallery and in brick; the roof was conical and in slate. It was located on the south side of the Thames, and at the time was in the county of Surrey. The dimensions were later given as 120 feet by 132 feet, i.e. 1760 square yards; originally the area was under 1000 square yards, however. It was located on Great Surrey Street, fronting on the Georgian terrace there (and was only later properly known as 3 Blackfriars Road, the street name being changed in 1829). The layout is believed to be documented only by a single surviving sketched floor plan.

The Leverian collection was moved in from Leicester House in 1788. At the time the nearby buildings on Albion Place were industrial: the British Glass Warehouse by the side of the river (in business from 1773), and the Albion Mills over the street (burned down in 1791).

=== Parkinson as museum owner ===
Parkinson made serious efforts to promote the collection as a commercial venture.

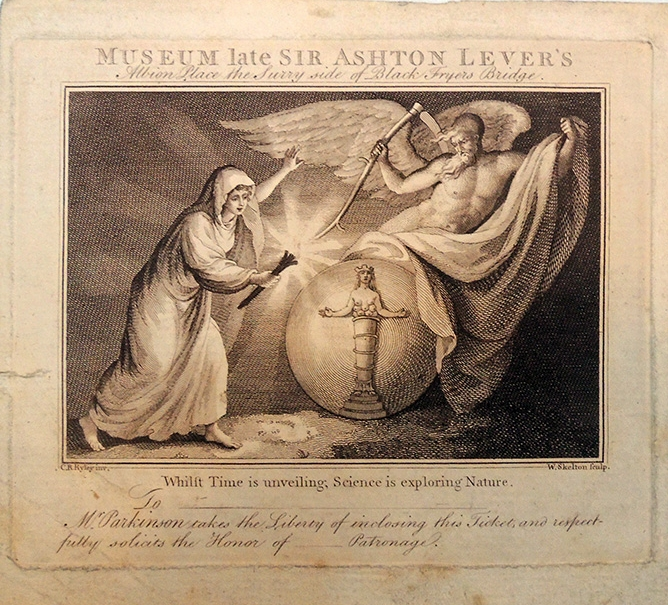
Leverian Museum admission ticket depicting Father Time and the unveiling and illumination of Mother Nature

A catalogue and guide was printed in 1790. He also had George Shaw write an illustrated scientific work.

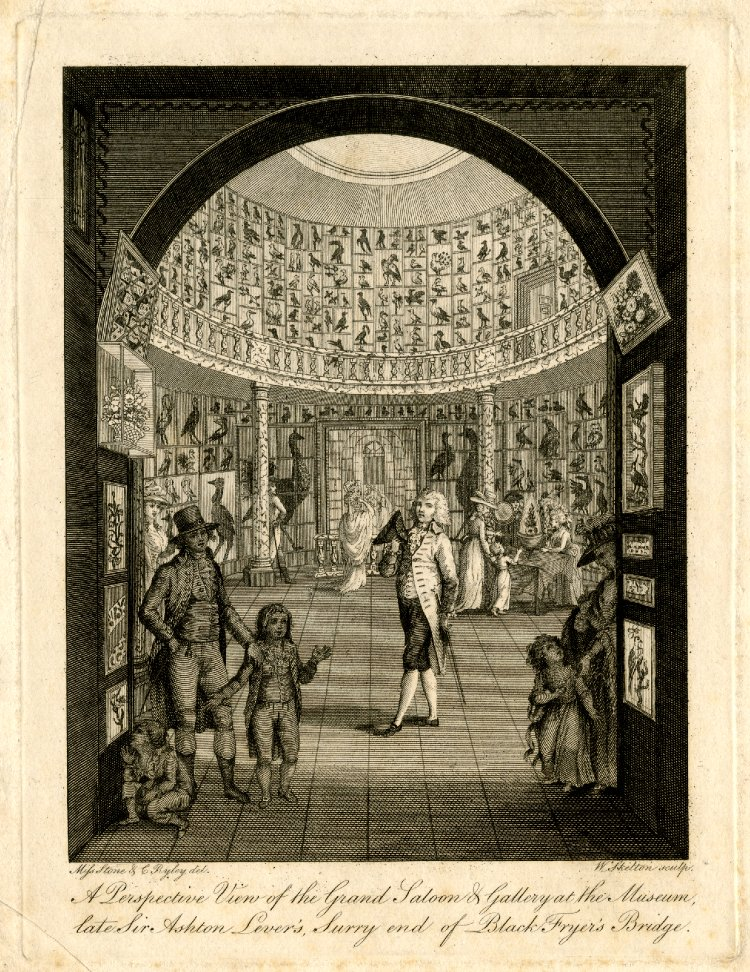
Leverian Museum collection in the Rotunda. Engraving by William Skelton after Sarah Stone and Charles Reuben Ryley.

Parkinson had some success in getting naturalists to attend the museum, which was easier at the time to visit than the British Museum. A visitor in 1799, Heinrich Friedrich Link, was complimentary. A description a visit to the museum for children can be found in The School-Room Party (1800).

=== Disposal of the collection ===
As well as trying to build it up as a business, Parkinson also tried to sell the contents at various times. One attempt, a proposed purchase by the government, was wrecked by the adverse opinion of Sir Joseph Banks. In the end, for financial reasons, Parkinson sold the collection in lots by auction in 1806. Among the buyers were Edward Donovan, Edward Stanley, 13th Earl of Derby, and William Bullock; many items went to other museums, including the Imperial Museum of Vienna.

== Adaptation for the Surrey Institution ==
When the Surrey Institution was being proposed, around 1807, the Rotunda Building (as it was then known) was adapted to the Institution's needs by Joseph T. Parkinson, son of James Parkinson. The Institution ran into financial difficulties, and was closed down in 1823.

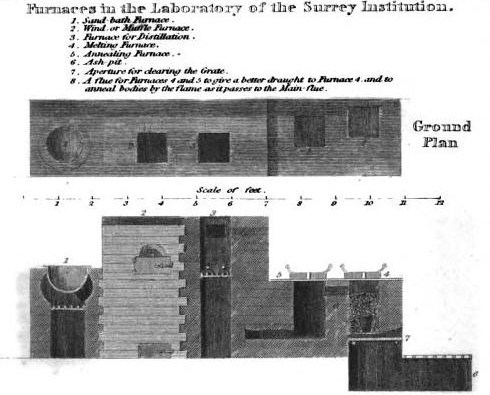
Furnaces at the Surrey Institution, from a chemistry book of 1822.

The building was adapted to public lectures, in a large theatre. There were other public rooms:

Adjoining the theatre and near the inclosed part appropriated to the lecturer, is the chemical laboratory, in which convenience, compactness, and elegance are united. Contiguous to it is the committee-room. On the other side of the theatre is the library, which is sixty feet in length, with a gallery on three sides, and an easy access to it by a flight of steps.

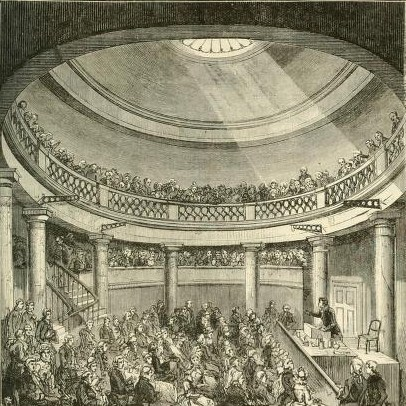
Interior view, 1820.

== Later uses ==
The building from 1823 was used in a variety of ways until 1855, when it was put to ordinary business use, as the Royal Albion pub.

In the 1820s it was a wine and concert room. It also hosted a diorama (a peristrephic panorama as described at the time), and a book about its representation of the Greek War of Independence was published in 1828. Under the title Old Rotunda Assembly Rooms the Rotunda is also written into the early history of music hall, for the performances of variety acts offered there in 1829, including the extemporiser Charles Sloman.

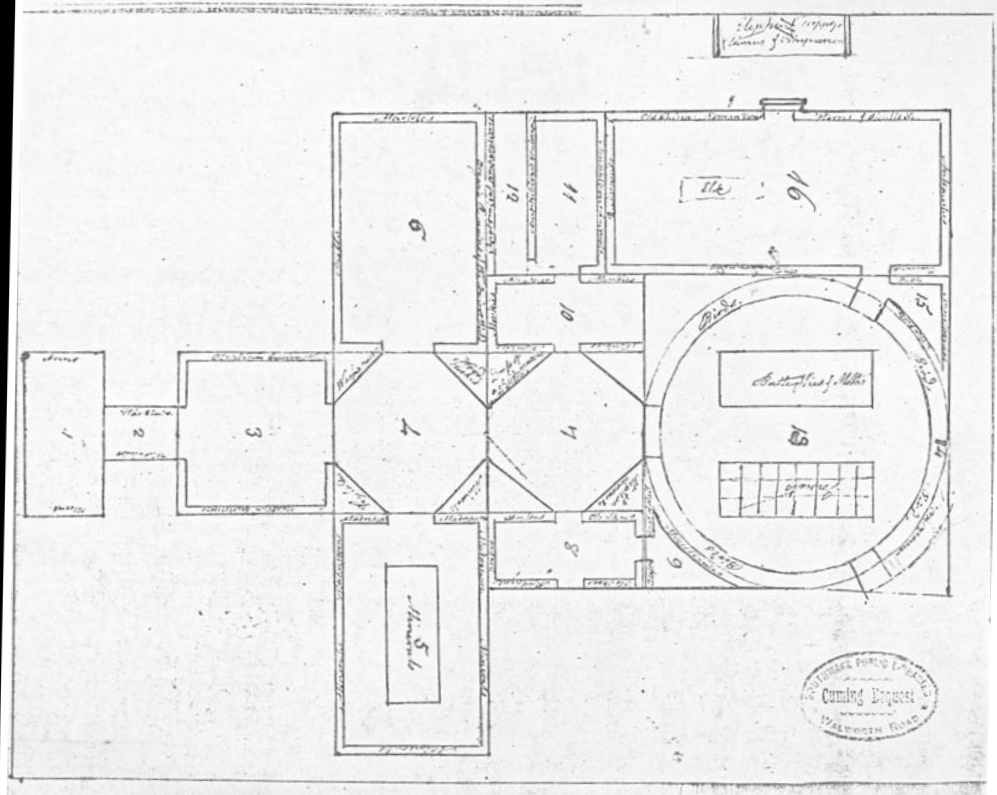
Floor plan of the Leverian Museum

In May or June 1830 Richard Carlile took over the Rotunda, and it became a centre for radical lectures and meetings. There were also waxworks and wild beasts. The Rotunda radicals, known at the time as Rotundists or Rotundanists, were a diverse group of social, political and religious radical reformers who gathered there, between 1830 and 1832, during Carlile's tenure. During this period almost every well-known radical in London spoke there at meetings which were often rowdy. The Home Office regarded the Rotunda as a centre of violence, sedition and blasphemy, and regularly spied on its meetings. In 1831 it was described as the Surrey Rotunda on Albion Place (the area south of Blackfriars Bridge, with the industrial buildings) leading to Albion Street.

From 1833 to 1838 it operated as the Globe Theatre; under John Blewitt it was called a "musick hall", and in 1838 the Rotunda was again a concert room. George Jacob Holyoake was teaching and lecturing there in 1843. At a later point it was the Britannia Music Hall. After an illegal cock fight was discovered, the Rotunda finally lost its entertainment licence, in 1886.

In 1912 the Rotunda was in use as a warehouse. The structure was damaged during World War II, and had been patched up by 1950. It was demolished in 1958.
