= Joseph T. Parkinson =

British architect (1783–1855)

Joseph T. Parkinson (1783 - May 1855, London) was an English architect.

He was the son of land agent and museum proprietor James Parkinson. He was articled to William Pilkington. He was a member of James Burton's Loyal British Artificers, a voluntary militia formed in consideration of the prospective invasion by France. In 1805, Parkinson designed a castellated house for Burton's personal residence, which Burton named Mabledon House, near Royal Tunbridge Wells in Kent. Parkinson's design of Mabledon was described in 1810 by the local authority as 'an elegant imitation of an ancient castellated mansion'.

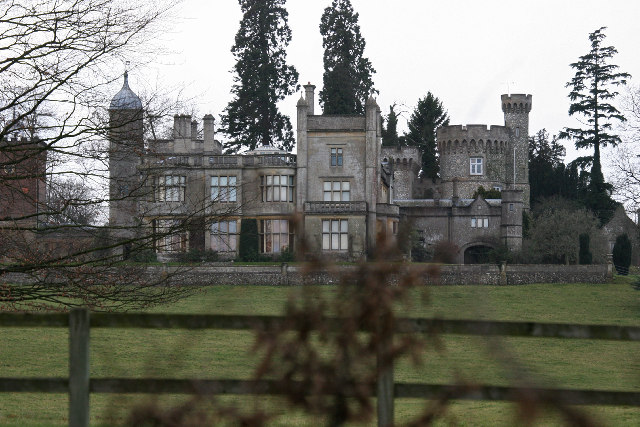
House of Rotherfield Park

He converted his father's Blackfriars Rotunda building, adding a new chemical laboratory and library for its use by the Surrey Institution from 1808. In 1811 he laid out London's Bryanston Square and designed houses in nearby Montagu Square. He was subsequently commissioned to design a new mansion at Rotherfield Park, near Winchester from 1815. Between 1822 and 1830 he supervised the reconstruction of parts of Magdalen College, Oxford, and in 1831, he directed the rebuilding of the body of Streatham's St Leonard's Parish Church.

His pupils included John Raphael Rodrigues Brandon, Thomas Hayter Lewis, and George Ledwell Taylor.

He was later surveyor to the Union Fire Assurance Company and also district surveyor of Westminster. He is buried in Kensal Green cemetery.
