= Leverian collection =

Former natural history and ethnographic collection

Leverian Museum
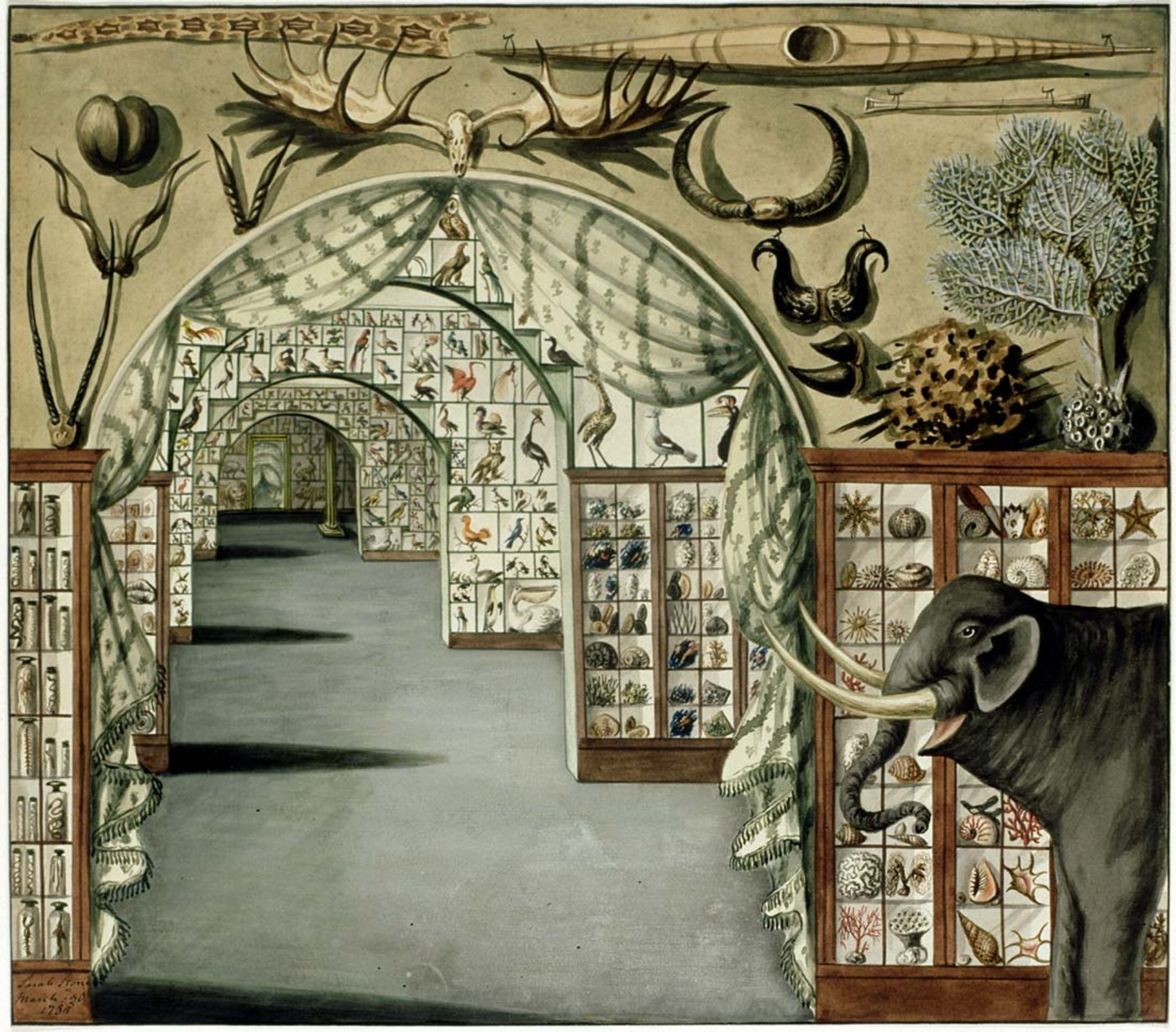
- Interior view of Sir Ashton Lever's Museum, Leicester Square, London, 30 March 1785

- Location within Central London
- Established: 1775
- Location: Leicester Square, London
- Coordinates: 51.510278°N 0.130278°W
- Collection size: c. 28,000 objects
- Director: Sir Ashton Lever
- Website: A collection of drawings by Sarah Stone

The Leverian collection was a natural history and ethnographic collection assembled by Ashton Lever. It was noted for the content it acquired from the voyages of Captain James Cook. For three decades it was displayed in London, being broken up by auction in 1806. The first public location of the collection was the Holophusikon, also known as the Leverian Museum, at Leicester House, on Leicester Square, from 1775 to 1786. After it passed from Lever's ownership, it was displayed for nearly twenty years more at the purpose-built Blackfriars Rotunda just across the Thames, sometimes called Parkinson's Museum for its subsequent owner, James Parkinson (c. 1730–1813).

== At Alkrington ==
Lever collected fossils, shells, and animals (birds, insects, reptiles, fish, monkeys) for many years, accumulating a large collection at his home at Alkrington, near Manchester. Admittance to the collection was free, but visitors who arrived on foot were turned away; only those who could afford a carriage or riding horse were welcome. He decided to exhibit the collection in London as a commercial venture, charging an entrance fee.

== At Leicester House ==
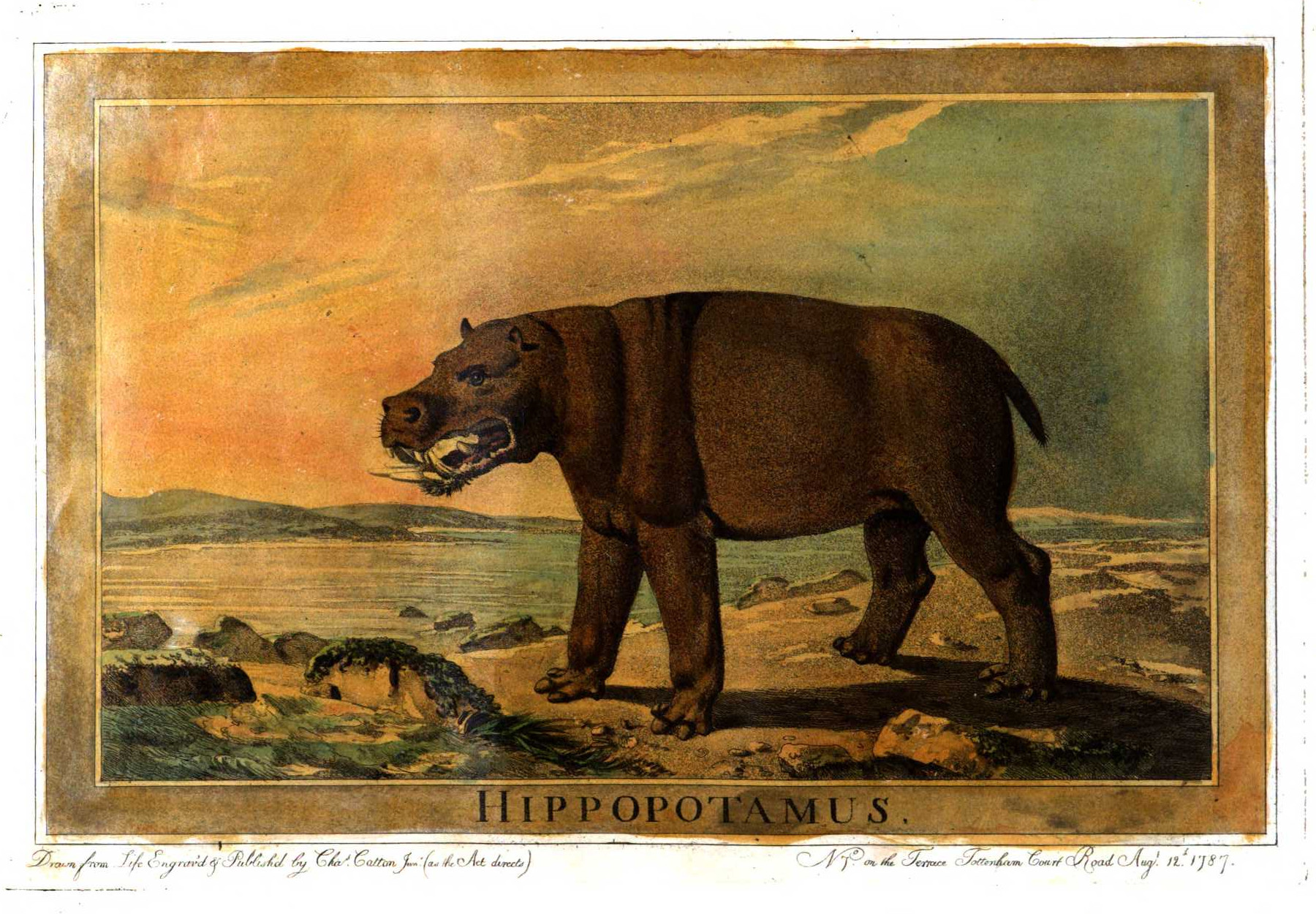
Aquatint of exhibit of a stuffed hippopotamus from Charles Catton's Animals

Lever acquired a lease of Leicester House in 1774, converting the principal rooms on the first floor into a single large gallery running the length of the house, and opened his museum in February 1775, with around 25,000 exhibits (a small fraction of his collection) valued at over £40,000. The display included many natural and ethnographic items gathered by Captain James Cook on his voyages. The museum took its name from its supposedly universal coverage of natural history, and was essentially a huge cabinet of curiosities.

Lever charged an entry fee of 5s. 3d., or two guineas for an annual ticket, and the museum had a degree of commercial success; the receipts in 1782 were £2,253. In an effort to draw in the crowds, Lever later reduced the entrance fee to half a crown (2s. 6d.). Lever was constantly looking for new exhibits. However, he spent more on new exhibits than he raised in entrance fees.

One admirer of the museum was a young Philip Bury Duncan, who went on to become keeper of the Ashmolean Museum. Among the objects displayed was the large Viking silver thistle brooch from the Penrith Hoard, discovered by a boy in Cumbria in 1785. In 1787, a print of it was published, claiming that it was the insignia of the Knights Templar. It was bought by the British Museum in 1909 (M&ME 1909,6–24,2).

== Lottery for the collection ==
Sale by Lottery of Sir Ashton Lever's Museum Act 1784
- Act of Parliament
- Parliament of Great Britain
- Long title: An Act for enabling Sir Ashton Lever to dispose of his Museum as now exhibited at Leicester House, by Way of Chance.
- Citation: 24 Geo. 3. Sess. 2. c. 22
- Territorial extent: Great Britain

Dates
- Royal assent: 30 July 1784
- Commencement: 18 May 1784 (Note: Start of session.)
- Repealed: 30 July 1948
Other legislation
Repealed by	Statute Law Revision Act 1948

Status: Repealed

Text of statute as originally enacted

The British Museum and Catherine II of Russia both refused to buy the collection, so Lever obtained an act of Parliament, the Sale by Lottery of Sir Ashton Lever's Museum Act 1784 (24 Geo. 3. Sess. 2. c. 22), to sell the whole by lottery. He only sold 8,000 tickets at a guinea each – he had hoped to sell 36,000.

The collection was acquired by James Parkinson, a land agent and accountant. It continued to be displayed at Leicester House until Lever's death in 1788, at a reduced entrance fee of one shilling.

== Move south of the Thames ==
Parkinson transferred the Leverian collection to a purpose-built Rotunda building, at what would later be No. 3 Blackfriars Road. Leicester House itself was demolished in 1791.

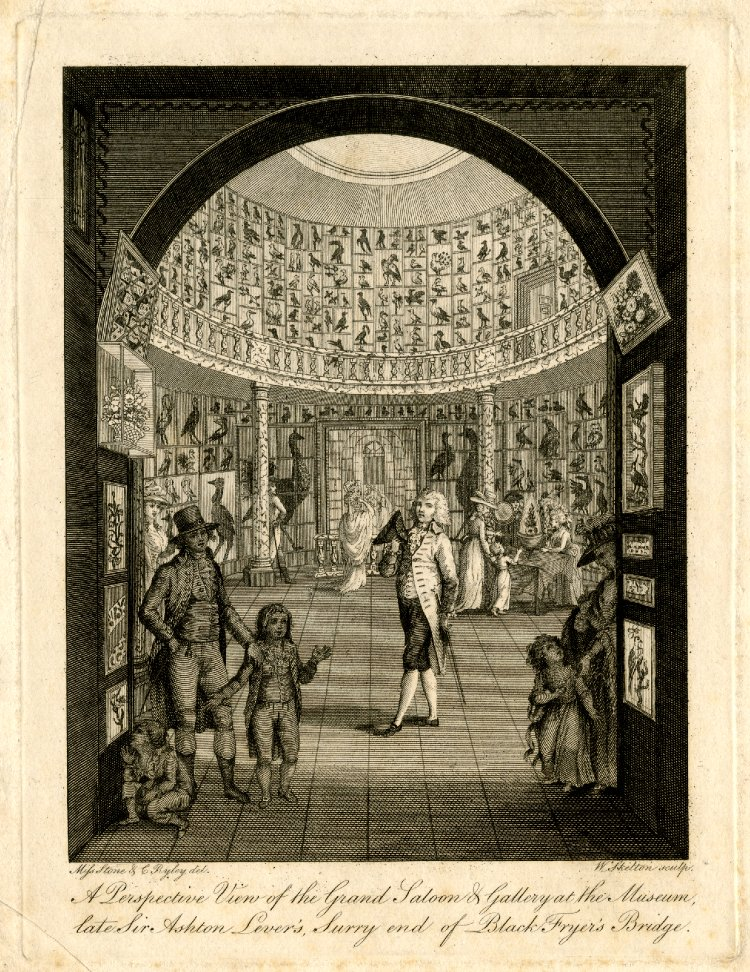
Leverian Museum collection in the Rotunda. Engraving by William Skelton after Charles Reuben Ryley

A catalogue and guide was printed in 1790. Parkinson also had George Shaw write an illustrated scientific work; the artists involved included Philip Reinagle, Charles Reuben Ryley, William Skelton, Sarah Stone, and Sydenham Edwards. Some of John White's specimens were put on public display there for the first time. The museum also served as a resource and opportunity for women. Ellenor Fenn wrote A Short History of Insects (1796/7), which also served as a "pocket companion" for the museum. The artist Sarah Stone continued to work for Parkinson, as she had done for Lever.

Parkinson had some success in getting naturalists to attend the museum, which was easier at the time to visit than the British Museum. Heinrich Friedrich Link, who visited in 1799, was complimentary.

== Disposal of the collection ==
Parkinson also tried to sell the contents at various times. One attempt, a proposed purchase by the government, was wrecked by the adverse opinion of Sir Joseph Banks. In the end, for financial reasons, Parkinson sold the collection in lots by auction in 1806. Among the buyers were Edward Donovan, Edward Stanley, 13th Earl of Derby, and William Bullock; many items went to other museums, including the Imperial Museum of Vienna.

The contents of the museum are well recorded, from a catalogue of the museum created in 1784, and the sale catalogue in 1806, with a contemporary series of watercolours of its contents by Sarah Stone. There are also sale catalogue annotations allowing, for example, the counting of 37 lots bought by Alexander Macleay. The Royal College of Surgeons bought 79 lots, and notes by William Clift survive. Purchases from the sale founded the collection of Richard Cuming. In all 7,879 lots were sold over 65 days.

== Surviving specimens and objects ==
The specimens purchased by Edward Stanley, 13th Earl of Derby, were bequeathed to the people of Liverpool upon his death in 1851 and were part of the founding collection of what is now World Museum, National Museums Liverpool. Stanley bought approximately 117 mounted birds, representing some 96 species, at the auction in 1806. 82 specimens still survived in 1812, 74 in 1823, and at least 29 in 1850. Among the present collections of World Museum are 25 study skins (relaxed mounts) of 22 species recognised as having originated from the Leverian Sale. Nine are recognised as having been collected during the second voyage of James Cook and third voyage of James Cook.

- Black-spotted barbet, adult male, accession no. NML-VZ D1466, Leverian lot no. 1039. The female specimen from the same lot (accession no. LIV D1466c) is lost.
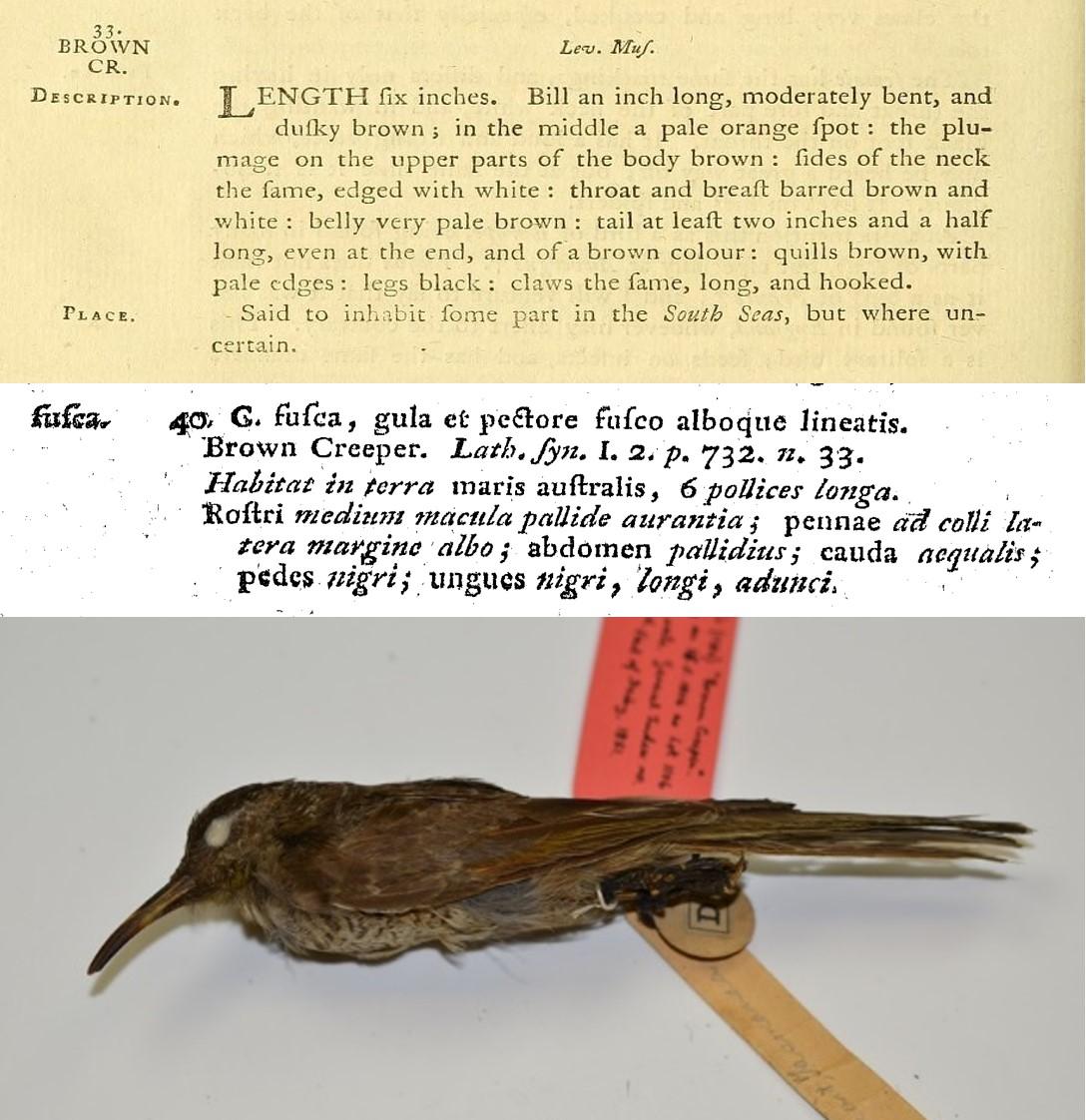
- Latham's Brown Creeper NML-VZ D5322
  Barred honeyeater, adult, accession no. NML-VZ D5322, Leverian lot no. 1106. This specimen is the holotype specimen of Certhia fusca Gmelin, 1788 (Syst. Nat. 1, p. 472) and was first described as "Brown Creeper" by Latham, 1782 (Gen. Syn. 1 (2), p. 732). This specimen is also the type of Certhia fasciata Forster, 1844 (Descr. Anim., p. 263). It was collected during the second voyage of James Cook.
- Pacific long-tailed cuckoo, adult, accession no. NML-VZ D3995, Leverian lot no. 1407. This specimen was first described as "Society Cuckow" by Latham, 1782 (Gen. Syn. 1 (2), p. 517).
- European green woodpecker, adult, accession no. NML-VZ D1324f, Leverian lot no. 1418. This specimen is the "white variety".
- Orange-winged amazon, adult, accession no. NML-VZ D682, Leverian lot no. 1514. This specimen was described as "Brazilian Yellow-fronted Parrot var. E" by Latham, 1781 (Gen. Syn. 1 (1), p. 287).
- Crested myna, adult, accession no. NML-VZ D1504, Leverian lot no. 1757.
- Grey-winged trumpeter, adult, accession no. NML-VZ D252, Leverian lot no. 2436.
- South Island kōkako, adult, accession no. NML-VZ D4047, Leverian lot no. 2698. This specimen is a syntype specimen of Glaucopis cinereus Gmelin, 1788 (Syst. Nat. 1, p. 363) and was first described as "Cinereous Wattle-bird" by Latham, 1781 (Gen. Syn. 1 (1), p. 364). It was collected during one of James Cook's voyages from Queen Charlotte Sound / Tōtaranui. This species is critically endangered and possibly extinct.
- Common starling, adult, accession no. NML-VZ D1417b, Leverian lot no. 3142. This specimen is albino and was described as "Var A, White Stare" by Latham, 1783 (Gen. Syn. 2 (1), p. 3).
- Greater ani, adult, accession no. NML-VZ D4027d, Leverian lot no. 4092.
- Magnificent bird-of-paradise, adult, accession no. NML-VZ D88, Leverian lot no. 4751.
- Ancient murrelet, adult, accession no. NML-VZ D3346, Leverian lot no. 5115. This specimen is a syntype specimen of Alca antiqua Gmelin, 1789 (Syst. Nat. 1 (2), p. 554) and was first described as "Ancient Auk" by Latham, 1785 (Gen. Syn. 3 (2), p. 326).
- ʻŌʻū, adult male and female, accession nos. NML-VZ D1829 and NML-VZ D1829a, Leverian lot no. 5488. These specimens are syntype specimens of Loxia psittacea Gmelin, 1789 (Syst. Nat. 1 (2), p. 844) and was first described as "Parrot-billed grosbeak" by Latham, 1783 (Gen. Syn. 2 (1), p. 108).
- Racket-tailed treepie, adult, accession no. NML-VZ D575a, Leverian lot no. 5587.
- Chattering kingfisher, adult, accession no. NML-VZ D2326, Leverian lot no. 5612. This specimen was collected during one of James Cook's voyages, but is of doubtful type significance.
- Purple-throated fruitcrow, adult, accession no. NML-VZ D635, Leverian lot no. 6082. This specimen is a syntype specimen of Muscicapa rubricollis Gmelin, 1789 (Syst. Nat. 1 (2), p. 933) and was first described as "Purple-throated flycatcher" by Latham, 1785 (Gen. Syn. 2 (1), p. 365).
- Stone partridge, adult, accession no. NML-VZ D1495b, Leverian lot no. 6083.
- Guinea turaco, adult, accession no. NML-VZ D97a, Leverian lot no. 27 (last day but two).
- Ruddy shelduck, adult, accession no. NML-VZ D849, Leverian lot no. 34 (last day but two).
- Tūī, adult male and female, accession nos. NML-VZ D1698a and NML-VZ D1698g, Leverian lot no. 44 (last day but one). These specimens are syntype specimens of Merops novaeseelandiae Gmelin, 1788 (Syst. Nat. 1, p. 464) and was first described as "Poe bee-eater" by Latham, 1782 (Gen. Syn. 1 (2), p. 682). These specimens were collected during the second voyage of James Cook from Queen Charlotte Sound / Tōtaranui.
- Large-billed seed finch, adult, accession no. NML-VZ D2005a, Leverian lot no. 47 (last day but one). 1106. This specimen is the holotype specimen of Loxia regulus Shaw, 1792 (Mus. Lev., p. 45), a forgery perpetrated by adding a false crest of red feathers to a large-billed seed finch specimen.
- African swamphen, adult, accession no. NML-VZ D1824, Leverian lot no. 23 (last day of the sale).
- Several hundred specimens (the exact number being unknown) of birds are in the collection of the Natural History Museum, Vienna. This includes a specimen (number NMW 50.761) of the extinct Lord Howe Swamphen.

A number of ethnographic objects survive in the collections of the British Museum.
