= George Shaw (biologist) =

English botanist and zoologist (1751–1813)

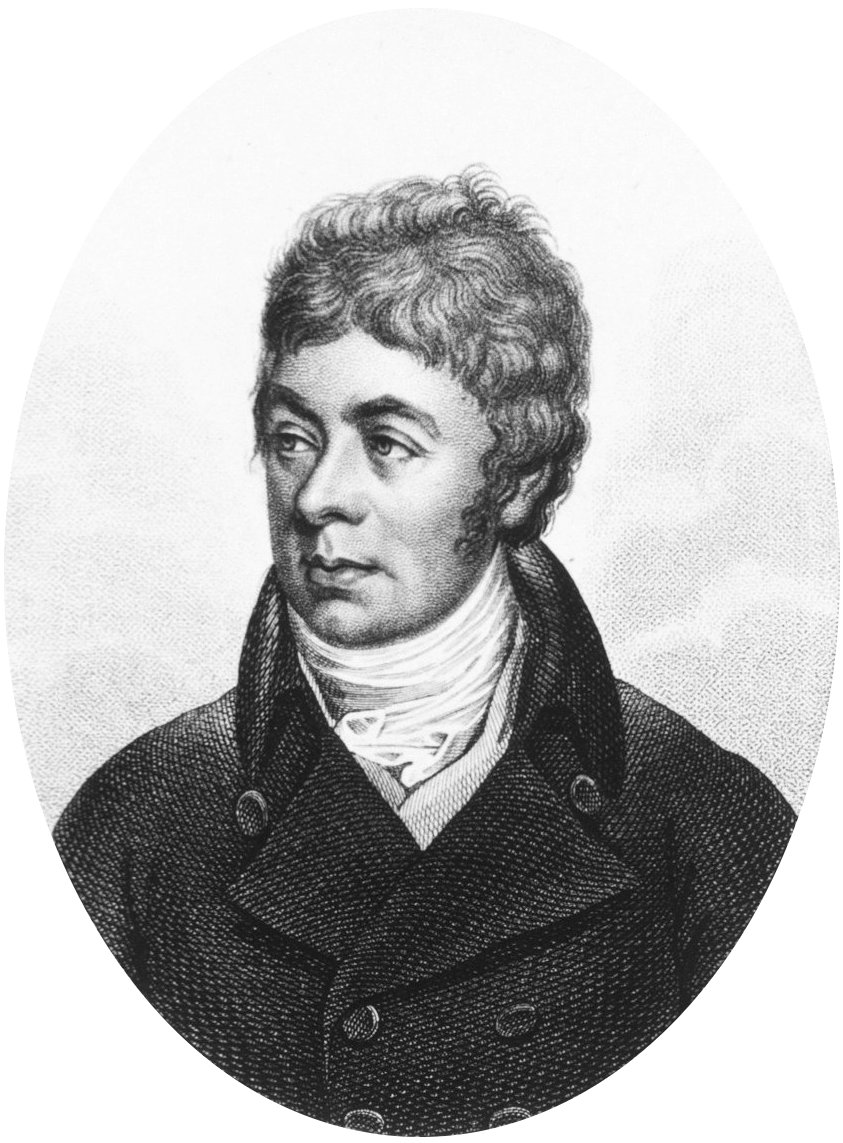
- Born: George Kearsley Shaw; 10 December 1751; Bierton, Buckinghamshire, England
- Died: 22 July 1813 (aged 61); London, England
- Education: Magdalen College, Oxford (MA)
- Scientific career
- Fields: Botany, Zoology
- Workplaces: University of Oxford
- Author abbrev. (botany): G.Shaw
- Author abbrev. (zoology): Shaw

Signature
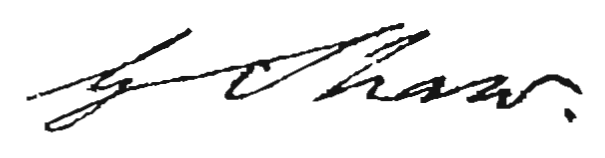

George Kearsley Shaw (10 December 1751 – 22 July 1813) was an English botanist and zoologist.

== Early life and education ==
Shaw was born at Bierton, Buckinghamshire, and was educated at Magdalen Hall, Oxford, receiving his M.A. in 1772. He took up the profession of medical practitioner. In 1786, he became the assistant lecturer in botany at the University of Oxford. He became a fellow of the Royal Society in 1789.

== Career ==
In 1791, Shaw became assistant keeper of the natural history department at the British Museum, succeeding Edward Whitaker Gray as keeper in 1806. He found that most of the items donated to the museum by Hans Sloane were in very bad condition.

Medical and anatomical material was sent to the museum at the Royal College of Surgeons, but many of the stuffed animals and birds had deteriorated and had to be burnt.

He was succeeded after his death by his assistant Charles Konig. Shaw's library of natural history books and some of his specimens and equipment were sold at auction by Leigh & Sotheby in London on 9 March 1814 (and two following days); a copy of the catalogue is in Cambridge University Library (shelfmark Munby.c.162(8)).

== Works ==
Shaw published one of the first English descriptions with scientific names of several Australian animals in his "Zoology of New Holland" (1794). He was among the first scientists to examine a platypus and published the first scientific description of it in The Naturalist's Miscellany in 1799.

In the field of herpetology, he described numerous new species of reptile and amphibian.

His other publications included:

- Musei Leveriani explicatio, anglica et Latina', containing select specimens from the museum of the late Sir Ashton Lever (1792–96), which had been moved to be displayed at the Blackfriars Rotunda.
- General Zoology, or Systematic Natural History (16 vol.) (1809–1826) (volumes IX to XVI by James Francis Stephens)
- The Naturalist's Miscellany: Or, Coloured Figures of Natural Objects; Drawn and Described Immediately From Nature (1789–1813) with Frederick Polydore Nodder (artist and engraver).

The standard botanical author abbreviation G.Shaw is applied to species he described.
