= Charles Reuben Ryley =

English painter

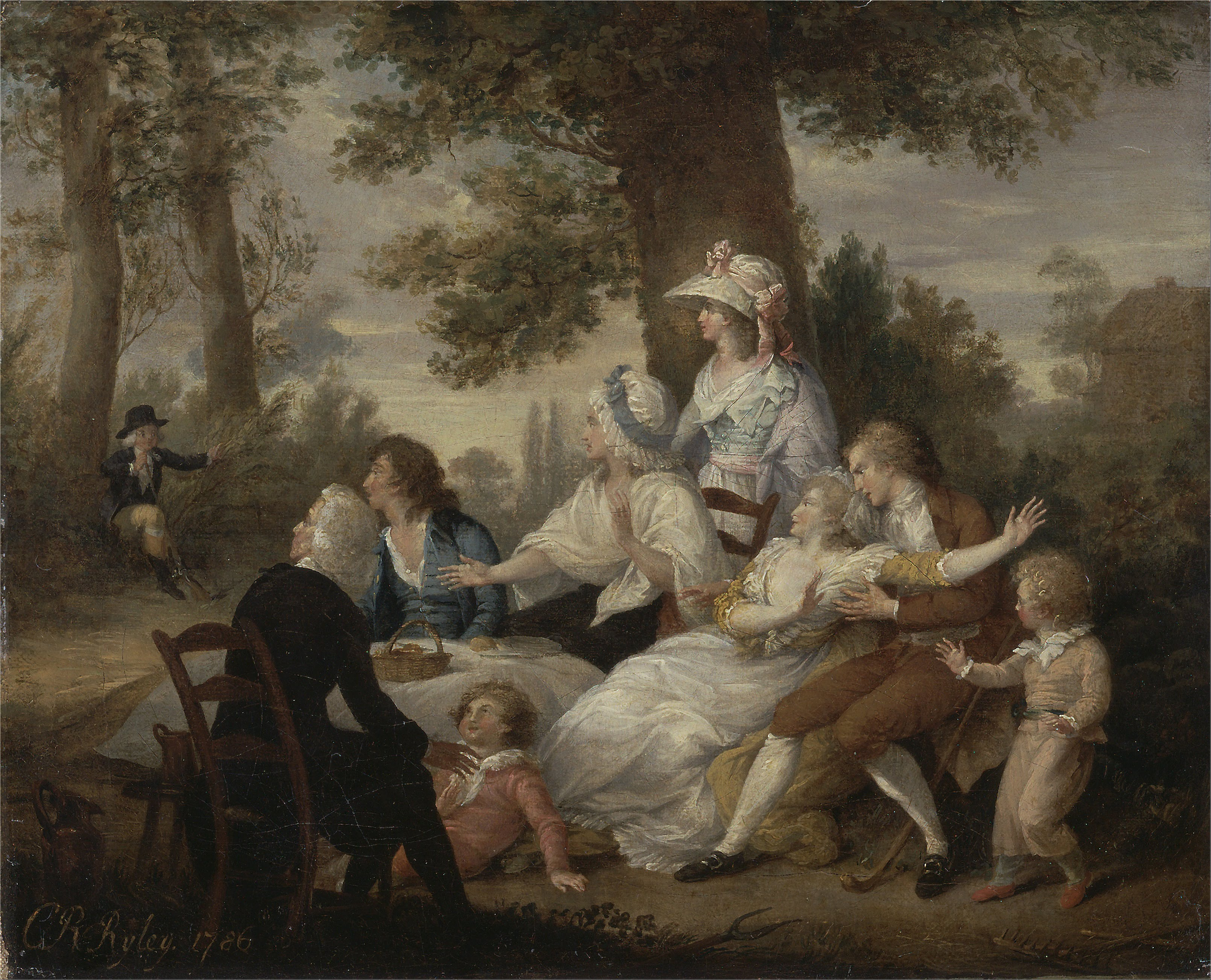
'The Vicar of Wakefield,' Vol. I, Chap. VIII: Dining in the Hayfields' (Surprised by Mr. Thornhill's Chaplain), oil on canvas, Charles Reuben Ryley, 1786.

Charles Reuben Ryley (1752?–1798) was an English painter.

== Life ==
The son of a trooper in the Horse Guards, he was born in London about 1752. He was of weak constitution and deformed in figure. At first he studied engraving, for which he received a premium in 1767 from the Society of Arts; later he took up painting and became a pupil of John Hamilton Mortimer, and a student of the Royal Academy. Bad health affected his work, and he worked for booksellers, and taught in schools. He died on 13 October 1798, at his house in what was then the New Road, Marylebone.

== Works ==
Ryley was awarded a gold medal in 1778 for a painting of Orestes on the point of being sacrificed by Iphigenia. He exhibited it at the Royal Academy in 1779, and was a constant exhibitor of drawings and small pictures, mostly in the style of his master, Mortimer. He was employed on decorative paintings by the Duke of Richmond at Goodwood, Mr. Willett at Merly, Mr. Conolly in Ireland, and elsewhere. Some his work was published as engravings. He was commissioned by James Parkinson to provide the artwork for the illustrations within Museum Leverianum Containing Select Specimens from the Museum of Sir Ashton Lever (published 1792–96).
