= William Skelton =

English engraver (1763–1848)

William Skelton (1763–1848) was an English engraver.

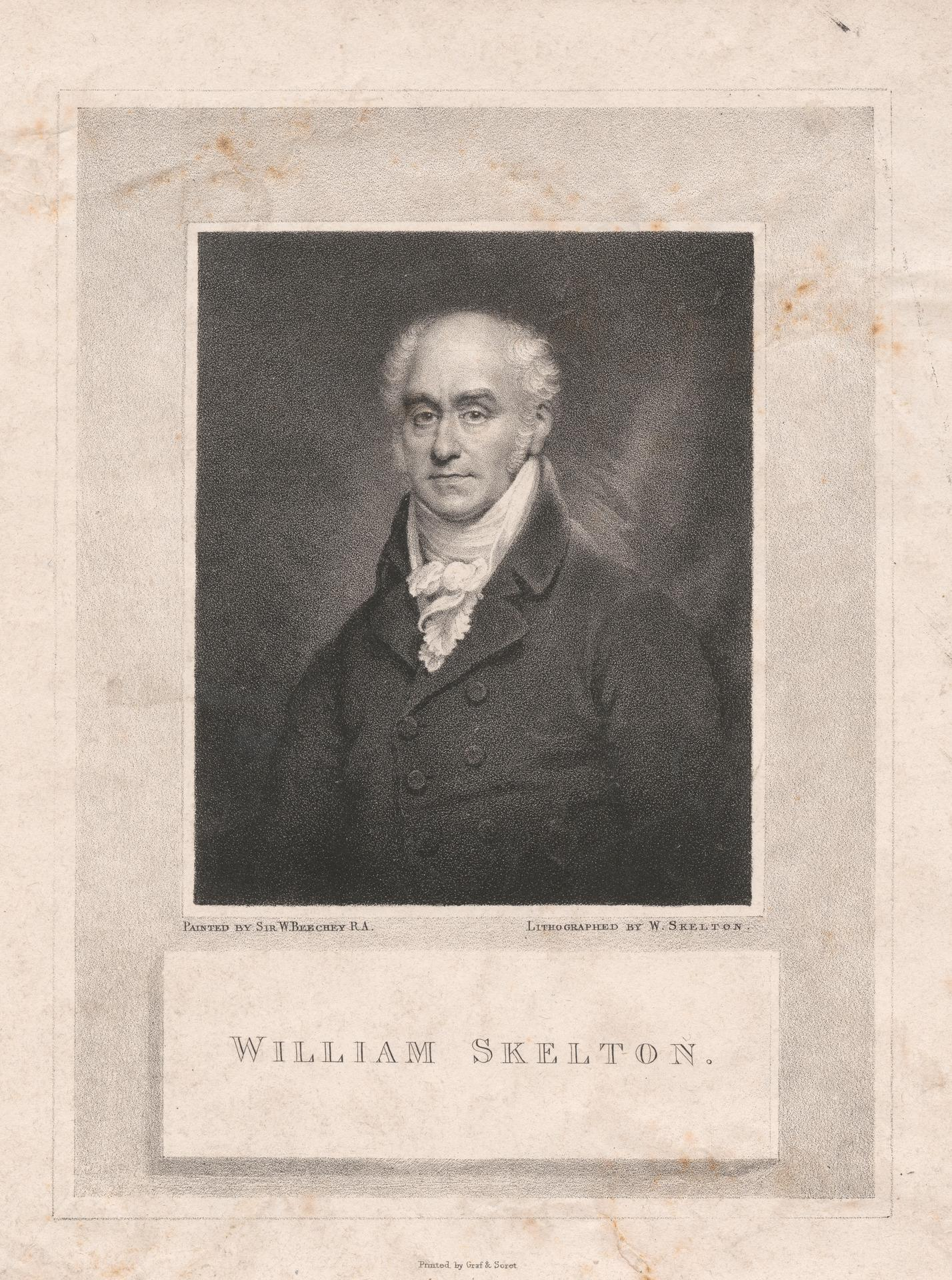
William Skelton A lithograph by himself, after William Beechey

== Life ==
He was born in London on 14 June 1763, the brother of the engraver Joseph Skelton. He studied in the schools of the Royal Academy, and was a pupil first of James Basire and later of William Sharp, becoming a line engraver.

Skelton resided for many years at Stafford Place, Pimlico, London, and afterwards in Upper Ebury Street, where he died on 13 August 1848, having long previously retired. For fifty years he served on the committee of the Female Orphan Asylum.

== Works ==
Skelton was employed on the illustrations of many of the fine publications of the day: John Boydell's Shakespeare, Thomas Macklin's Bible, Robert Bowyer's edition of David Hume's History of England, John Sharpe's British Classics, Lord Macartney's Embassy to China, 1797, the Museum Worsleyanum of Richard Worsley, Ancient Marbles in the British Museum, and Specimens of Ancient Sculpture published by the Dilettanti Society, 1810.

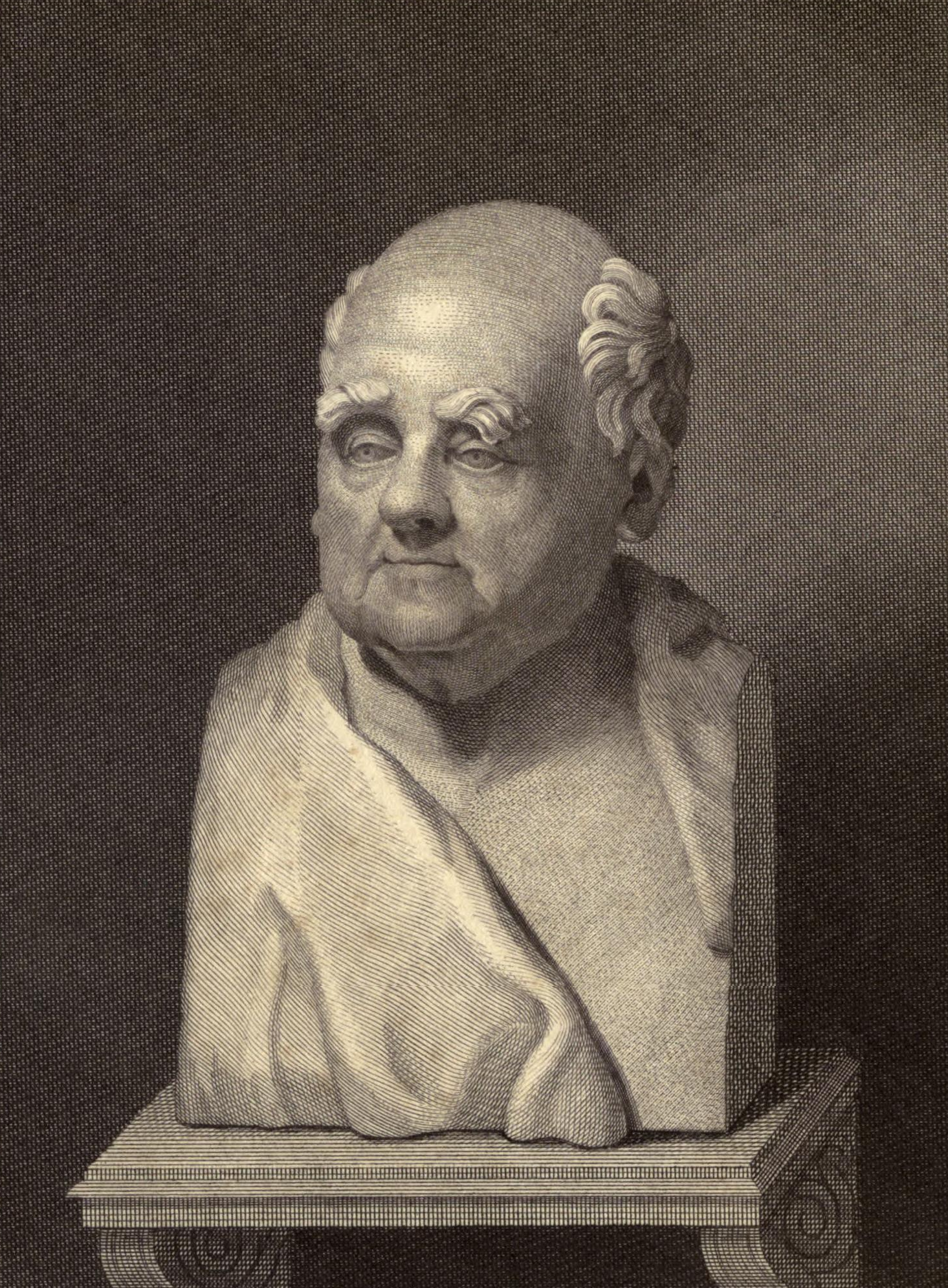
Engraving of the bust of Samuel Parr by George Clarke.

Skelton is best known for his many portraits of contemporary notabilities, mainly from pictures by Sir William Beechey, most of which he published himself between 1790 and 1820. They included:

- a series of George III and his sons, which became extremely popular;
- Robert Markham, D.D., 1790;
- Thomas Denman, M.D., 1792;
- Jean François de La Marche, Bishop of St. Pol de Léon, 1797;
- Henry, Lord Mulgrave, 1808;
- Spencer Perceval, 1813; and
- Warren Hastings, 1817.

One of his last plates was a portrait of the Queen of Würtemberg after P. Fischer, which he issued in 1828. Skelton executed in lithography portraits of himself and Beechey.
