= James Parkinson (museum proprietor) =

English proprietor of the Leverian Museum (1730–1813)

James Parkinson (baptised 28 February 1730, St Mary's Church, Shrewsbury – 25 February 1813) was an English land agent and the proprietor of the Leverian Museum which he won in a lottery. He then moved the Leverian collection to a museum at the Blackfriars Rotunda which was sometimes referred to as "Parkinson's Museum". He has sometimes been confused with the surgeon James Parkinson.

== Life ==
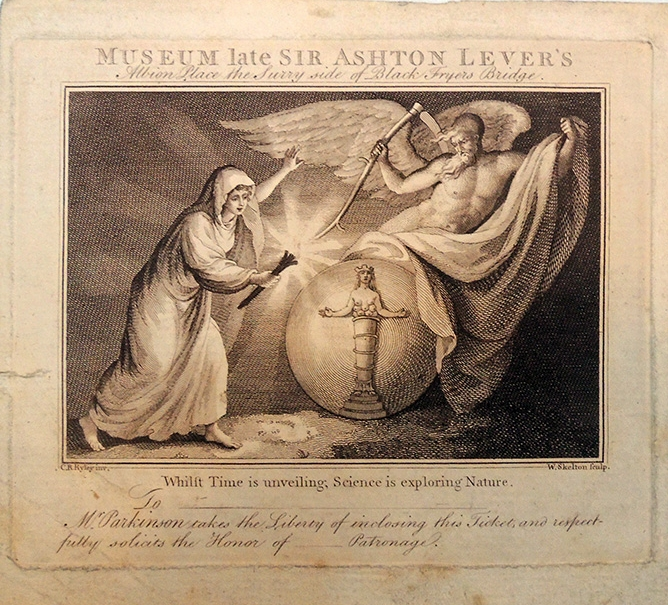
The ticket for the museum sold at 2 shillings and 6 pence

Parkinson was the son of James Parkinson and his wife, Jane Birch who had moved from Ireland to Shrewsbury in Shropshire, England, in 1723. His first training was as a law stationer, but he then became a land agent and accountant. In 1769 he helped in the settlement of Sir Thomas Robinson's tangled estates at Rokeby, Yorkshire. This success made his reputation. He later became involved in the Ranelagh Gardens.

Parkinson's wife Sarah (married around 1775) had bought two tickets at a guinea each of the lottery for the disposal of the Holophusicon collection of Sir Ashton Lever sometime in 1784. On 23 March 1786, the draw had been made and Parkinson later discovered that his wife, now deceased, had won the lottery. The formation of the collection had bankrupted Lever. Parkinson spent nearly two decades trying to make a success of its display, at the Blackfriars Rotunda, which he specially designed with the help of his son, the architect Joseph T. Parkinson. He published various pamphlets; however, the museum did not pay enough for its own maintenance and, after twenty years, he put it up for auction in 1806, and the collection was dispersed. The auction took place over 65 days, with a total of 8000 lots, and earned a total of £6600.

Parkinson had two sons and a daughter. Of the sons, John (1775-1847) who had an interest in minerals became a diplomat, and was elected FRS in 1840 while Joseph (1782-1855) became an architect.
