= Ashton Lever =

English collector of natural objects (1729–1788)

Sir Ashton Lever FRS
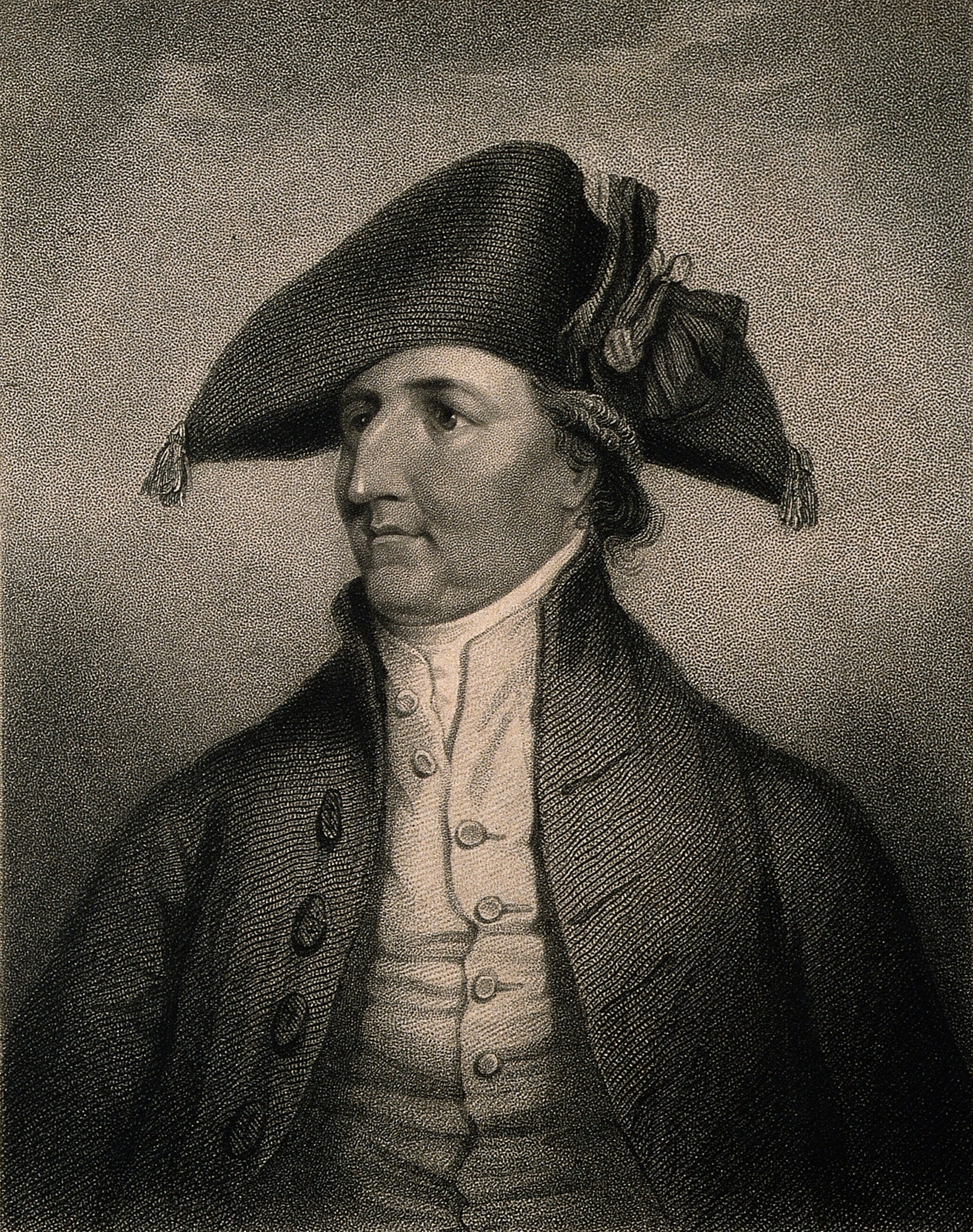
- Born: 5 March 1729; Alkrington Hall, England, Kingdom of Great Britain
- Died: 28 January 1788 (aged 58); Kingdom of Great Britain
- Occupation: British antiquarian

Sir Ashton Lever FRS (5 March 1729 – 28 January 1788) was an English collector of natural objects, in particular the Leverian collection.

== Biography ==
Lever was born in 1729 at Alkrington Hall. In 1735 Sir James Darcy Lever, his father, served as High Sheriff of Lancashire.

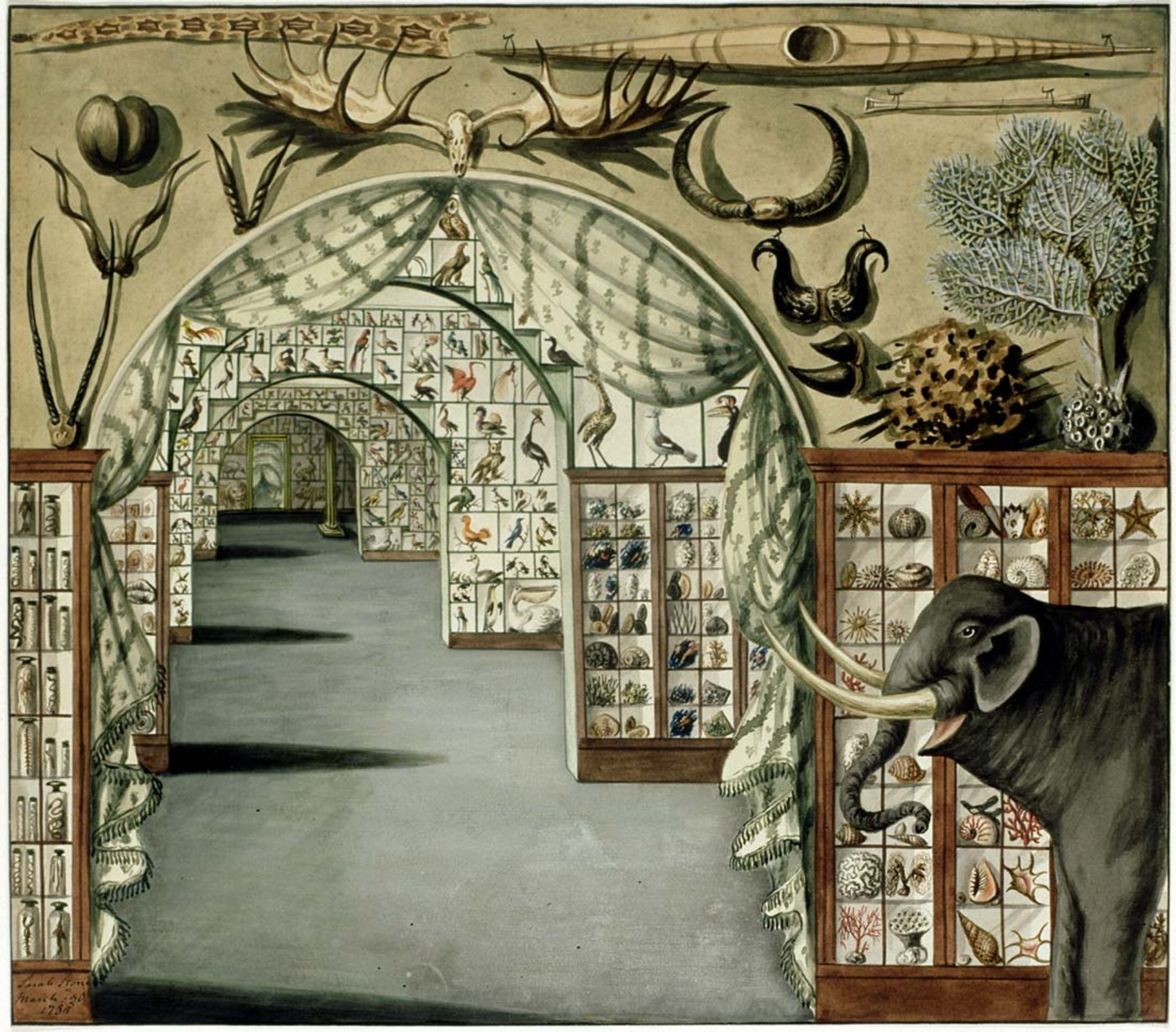
Perspective interior view of Sir Ashton Lever's Museum in Leicester Square, London 30 March 1785

Lever began by collecting seashells in about 1760, and gradually accumulated one of the richest private collections of natural objects, including live animals. He opened it to the public in April 1766, in Manchester, moving the museum to his family home at Alkrington Hall, near Rochdale, Lancashire, in 1771. In the same year he founded Archers' Hall, Inner Circle, Regent's Park, London for the Archers' Company of the Honourable Artillery Company. In 1774, Lever moved to London, and next year his Holophusicon opened to the public in Leicester Square. Captain James Cook was impressed by Lever's collection, and donated objects from his own voyages to the museum.

Lever continued to buy items until he became bankrupt, at which point the collection contained 28,000 specimens. Both the British Museum and the Empress of Russia declined to buy it, so it was disposed of by lottery: 8,000 tickets were sold at a guinea each. The winner, James Parkinson, later put the collection up for auction in 1806, when the largest purchasers were the British naturalist Edward Donovan and Leopold von Fichtel, bidding on behalf of the Natural History Museum, Vienna. Purchasers included the Earl of Derby and William Bullock, who had a large private collection.

Lever's collection was catalogued by George Shaw. Lever also founded the Royal Toxophilite Society in 1787.
