= John Cleveley =

John Cleveley may refer to:

- John Cleveley the Elder (c. 1712–1777), marine artist
- John Cleveley the Younger (1747–1786), his son, marine artist, twin brother of Robert Cleveley
