= James Campbell (artist) =

English painter

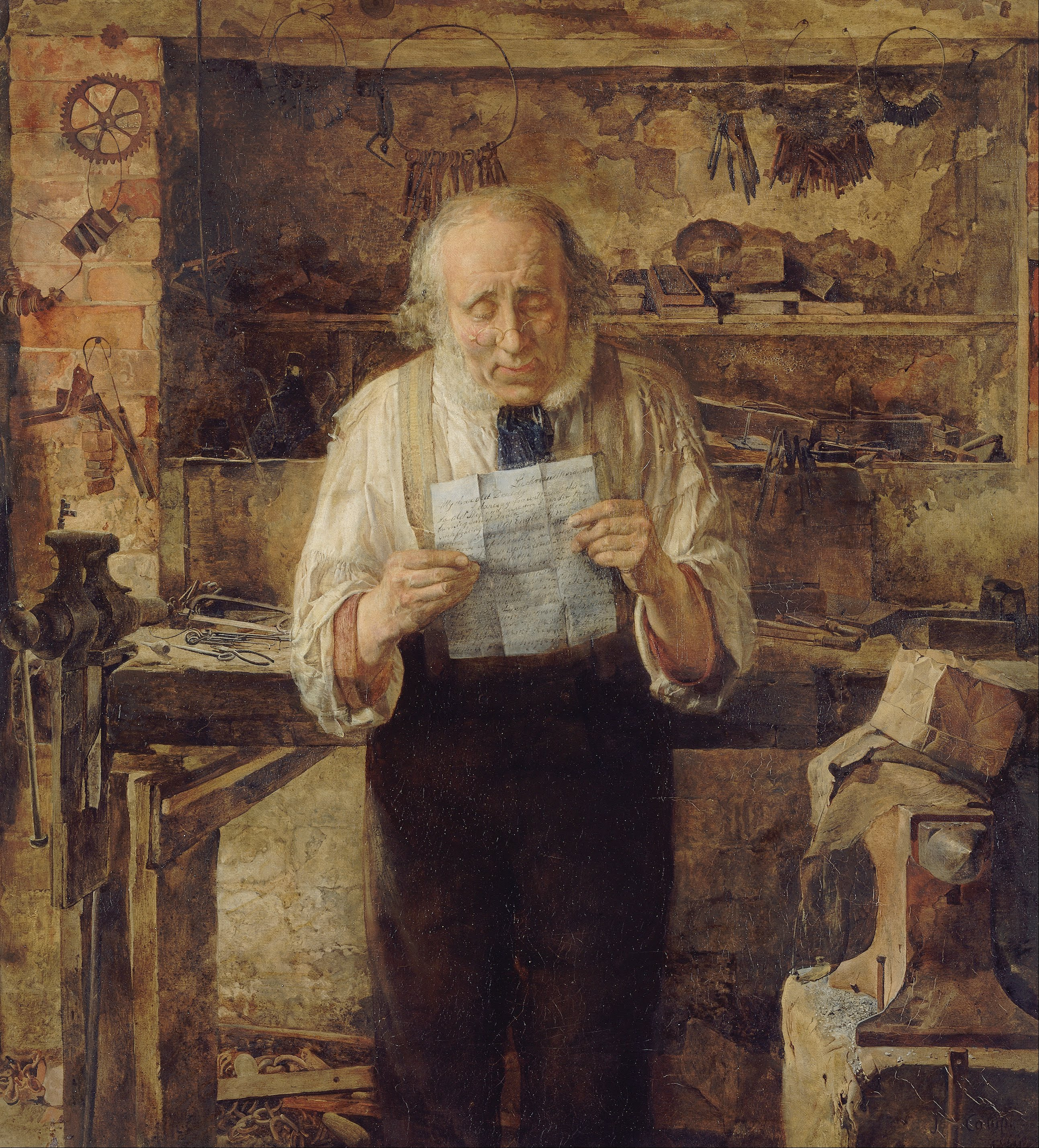
News from My Lad

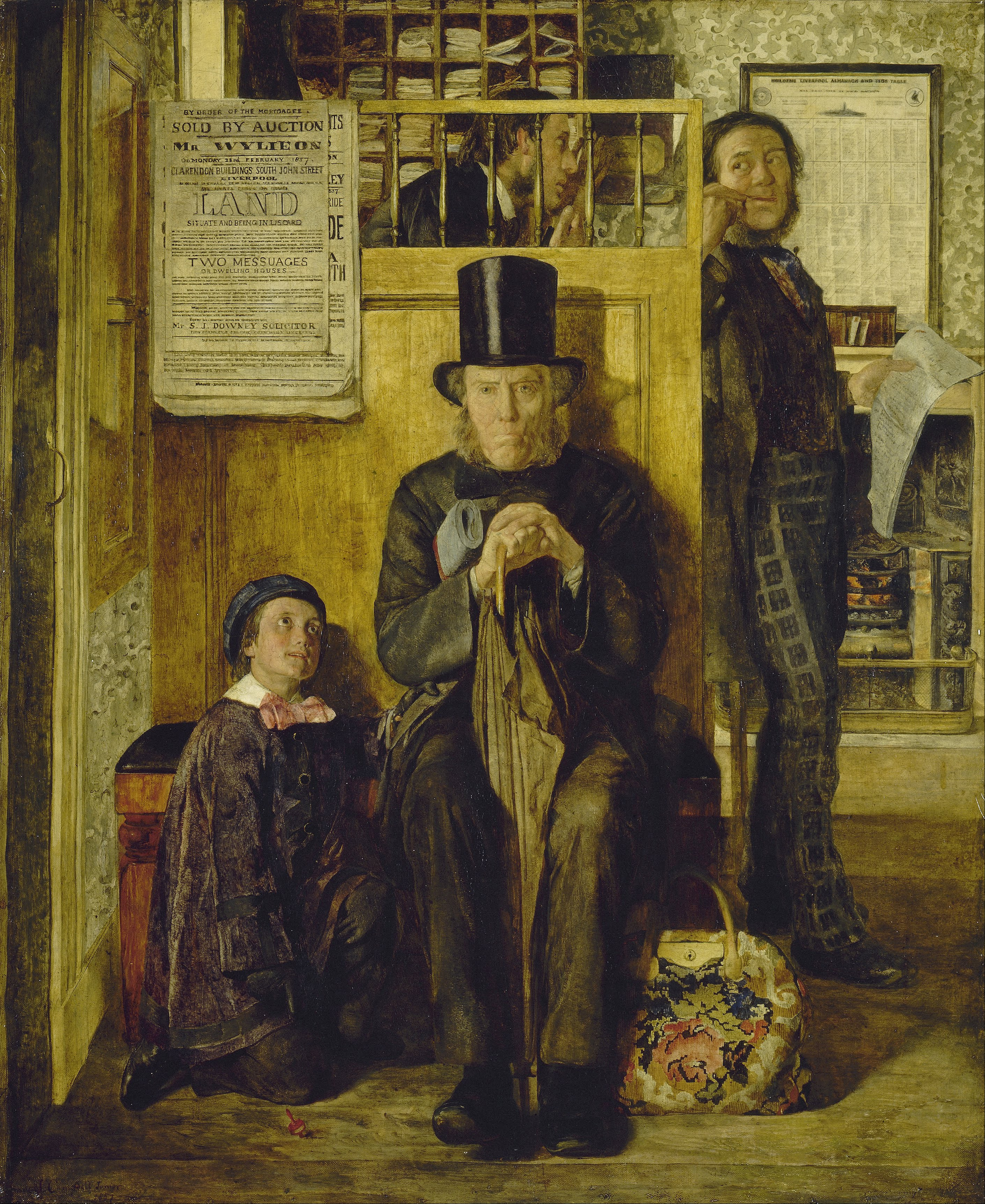
Waiting for Legal Advice (1857)

James Campbell (Liverpool, 1828 – Birkenhead, 1893) was an English artist, part of a group from Liverpool who were influenced by the Pre-Raphaelite style. He studied briefly at the Liverpool Academy and then moved on to the Royal Academy Schools in 1851.

His pictures focused on the details of lower-middle class and working class life in his native Liverpool, with works such as Waiting for Legal Advice (1857) which drew on his first hand experience as son of an insurance clerk. The Walker Art Gallery describes him as "the most Dickensian of all the Pre-Raphaelites."

== See also ==
- List of Pre-Raphaelite paintings - including the work of James Campbell.
- William Lindsay Windus
- Daniel Alexander Williamson
- John Lee
- William Davis
