= Walter Leslie =

Walter Leslie may refer to:

- Walter Leslie (crusader) (?–1382), 14th-century Scottish nobleman and crusader
- Walter Leslie (field marshal) (1607–1667), Holy Roman Empire Field Marshal
- Walter Leslie (Indian Army officer) (1876–1947), Indian Army officer

== See also ==
- Walter Lesly, a traditional English-language folk ballad composed before 1800
- Walter Leslie AuCoin (born 1942), American politician
- Walter Leslie Brine (aka Salty Brine; 1918–2004), American broadcaster
- Walter Leslie Brown (1910–1944), Canadian military chaplain
- Walter Leslie Duncan (1883–1947), Australian politician and trade unionist
- Walter Leslie Farrer (1900–1984), British solicitor
- Walter Leslie Runciman, 2nd Viscount Runciman of Doxford (1900–1989), member of the Runcimans, a Newcastle ship-owning and political family
- Walter Leslie Wilmshurst (1867–1939), English author and Freemason
