= John Lee (artist) =

English painter

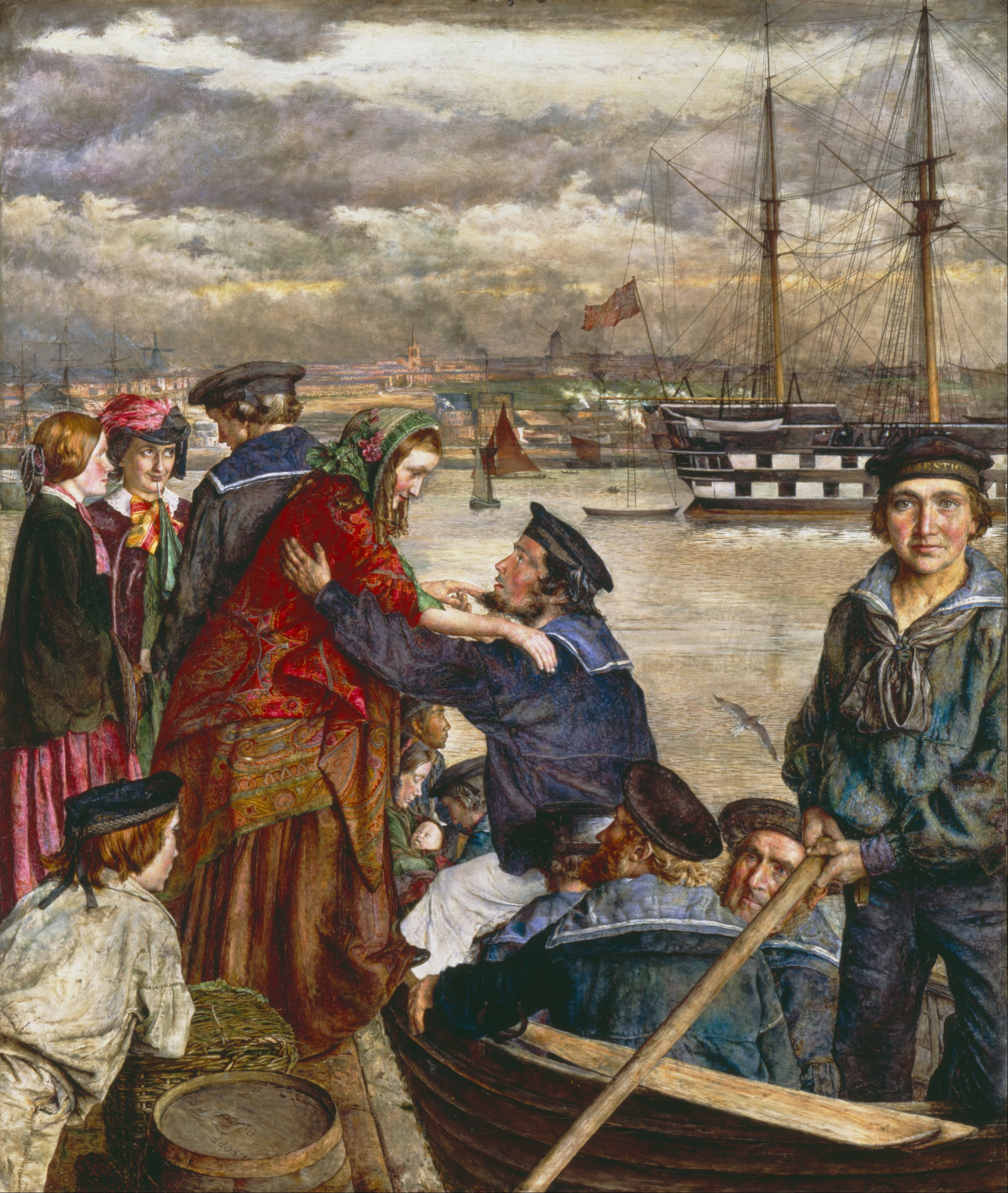
Sweethearts and Wives by John Lee, one of his four known paintings

John Lee (active 1850–1870) was a British Victorian painter in a loosely Pre-Raphaelite style. He was part of a group of Merseyside artists from the period which also included William Lindsay Windus and William Davis. The son of Liverpool merchants, he lived in Rock Ferry before moving to London in 1866. His works were shown at the Liverpool Academy from 1859 to 1867 and at the Royal Academy from 1863 to 1867. However, little else is known of his life, and only four paintings have been attributed to him with any certainty.

Sweethearts and Wives, 1860, is considered Lee's masterpiece. It has been suggested that the rightmost sailor is a self-portrait of John Lee. The work is a typical dockside scene, which depicts sailors on the Liverpool docks going out to duty on HMS Majestic, which served as part of the harbour defences, and is visible anchored in the middle of the Mersey.

== See also ==
- List of Pre-Raphaelite paintings – including the work of John Lee.
- Daniel Alexander Williamson
- James Campbell
- British Marine Art (Romantic Era)
