= Daniel Williamson =

Daniel Williamson may refer to:

- Danny Williamson (footballer) (born 1973), former English footballer
- A DJ, stage name LTJ Bukem
- Daniel Alexander Williamson (1823–1903), British artist
- Dan Williamson (born 2000), New Zealand rower
