= British Marine Art (Romantic Era) =

Art movement

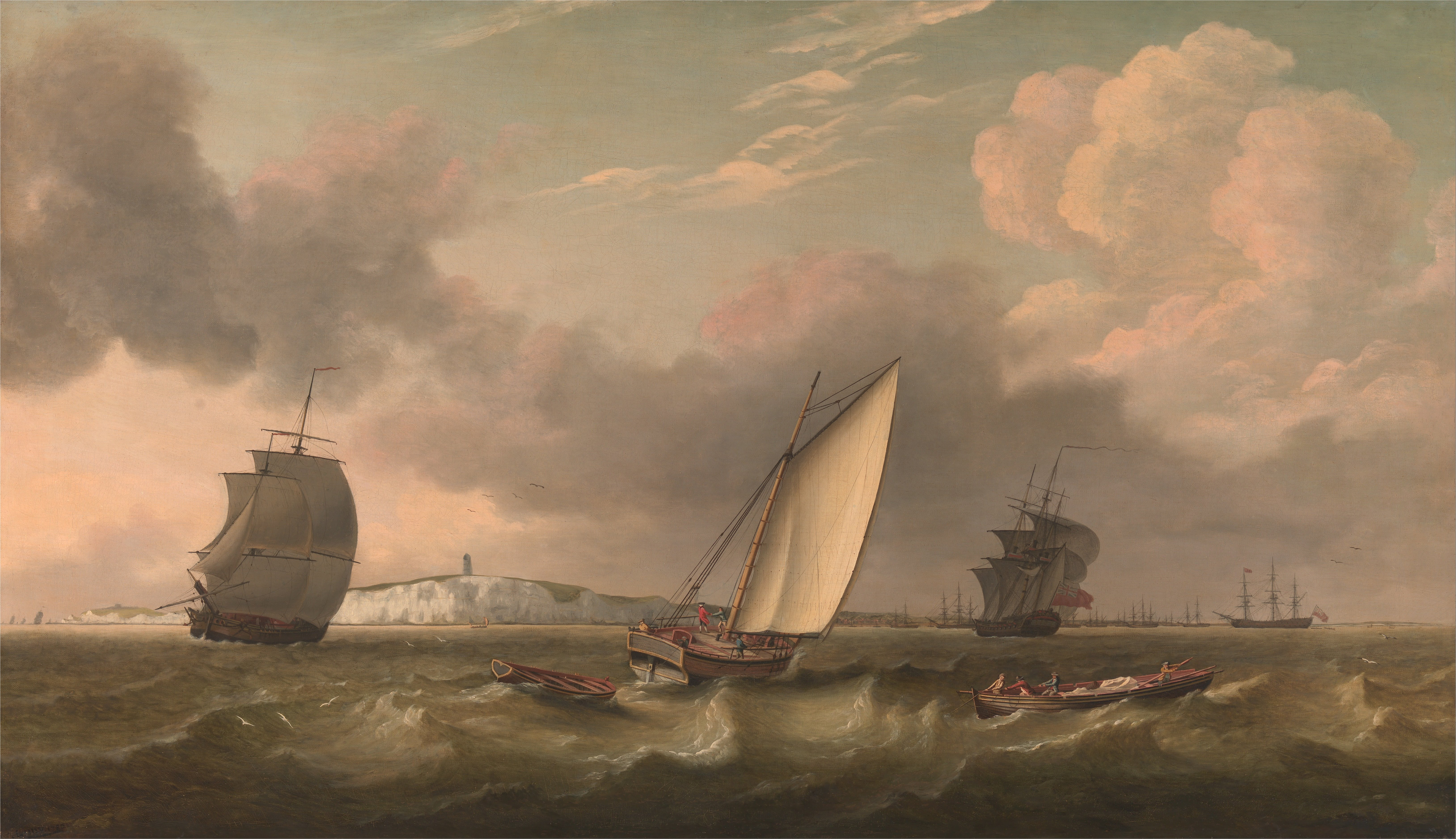
Thomas Luny, A Packet Boat Under Sail in a Breeze off the South Foreland (1780)

Marine art was especially popular in Britain during the Romantic Era, and taken up readily by British artists in part because of Great Britain's geographical form (an island). This article deals with marine art as a specialized genre practised by artists who did little or nothing else, and does not cover the marine works of the leading painters of the period, such as, and above all, J. M. W. Turner. The tradition of British marine art as a specialized genre with a strong emphasis on the shipping depicted began in large part with the artists Willem Van de Velde the Elder and his son, called the Younger in the early 18th century. The Van Veldes, originally from Holland, moved to England to work for King Charles II).

By the 17th century, marine art was commissioned mostly by merchant seamen and naval officers and created by marine art specialists (rather than artists in general). In part, marine art served as a visual portrayal of Britain's power on the sea and as a way of historically documenting battles and the like. As British sea captains began to recognize the ability of marine artists to bring Britain's success on the sea to the public on land, some took on an active role in supporting this type of artwork. For example, marine artist Robert Cleveley was hired by Captain William Locker to work in HMS Thames as a clerk, and Captain Locker, interested in employing artists, is believed to have played a significant role in encouraging Cleveley to work as a marine painter.

Captains would act as marine artists' patrons, commissioning them to paint portraits of themselves and pictures depicting important battles. A few significant marine artists who were supported in this way by naval officers are (among others) Nicholas Pocock, Thomas Luny, and George Chambers. William Hodges, for example, who was trained to draw at William Shipley's Academy (studying under Richard Wilson), was hired by the Admiralty to finish his pictures from Cook's 1772 voyage for publication upon reaching home in 1775. Captains also commissioned artists to paint portraits of their ships.

== Dutch Influence and the Beginning of the British Marine Art Tradition ==
The tradition of marine painting really began in Holland in the sixteenth and seventeenth centuries, perhaps because of the significance of seafaring in establishing and maintaining the Dutch Republic. Marine painting began in keeping with medieval Christian art tradition, and so the original paintings portrayed the sea only from a bird's eye view, and everything, even the waves, were organized and symmetrical. The viewpoint, symmetry, and overall order of these early paintings were to keep in mind the organization of the heavenly cosmos from which the earth was viewed. Later Dutch artists like Hendrick Vroom and Cornelius Claesz, however, developed new methods for painting, often from a horizontal point of view, with a lower horizon and more focus on realism than symmetry. Most notable of the Dutch artists’ who influenced the British marine art tradition were Willem van de Velde the Elder, and his son, the Younger. Willem van de Velde the Younger was especially admired and thus influential in England because he lived and worked there for thirty-five years. The methods developed by the Dutch to successfully depict some of the sea's more elusive features (light and shadow, or the reflection of the sky over the ocean's uneven surface, for example) were adopted by British artists as they founded their own marine art tradition. Knowledge of Dutch methods of marine painting was considered so fundamental to a successful marine painting education that it was likened to “grammar school” for the British marine artist. In fact, it is not uncommon to find Dutch ships painted into the works of British marine artists as a tribute to the Dutch artists from whom they gained so much knowledge and inspiration.

== The Romantic Era ==
In the Romantic era, interest in marine art expanded from its initial exclusive audience of sailors and naval officers to the general public. One reason for this increased interest may be the significance of the navy in Romantic British culture. With the increase of industry in Britain and the threatening resurgence of the French royal navy during the time after the Peace of Utrecht, England found means and motivation to improve its sea power on both the level of mercantilism and conquest. Later into the Romantic era the Napoleonic Wars, which were fought in large part on the sea, brought the British navy further to the forefront when the British navy played a significant role in defeated the French forces. The infamous Glorious First of June which marks a major British naval victory over the French during the French Revolutionary Wars, happened within the Romantic era (June 1, 1794) as did the Battle of Trafalgar of the Napoleonic Wars (October 21, 1805). For a contemporary depiction of the British navy during the Romantic era one might look to the popular fictional series by Patrick O'Brian which follows naval officer Captain Aubrey and his companion Maturin during the Napoleonic Wars or the Hornblower Saga by C.S. Forester which follows Horatio Hornblower as his career in the British navy progresses (also during the Napoleonic Wars). Whatever the reason, a new group of marine artists now made their way onto the scene. Landscape painters found inspiration in the sea and began to create work which was not always accurate, but which could be sold among the less technically sea-savvy art collectors in England.

== Types of Marine Painting ==
British marine paintings from this era can be divided into three main categories. These are: ship portraits, paintings of ships at sea, and inshore, coastal and harbour scenes.

Ship portraits, as mentioned above, were immensely popular before and throughout the Romantic era. Ship portraits were, as apparent by the name, focused entirely on the ship, rather than on the surrounding sea, although the best-known of the ship portraitists strove to carry the accuracy of their drawing out into the atmosphere surrounding the ship (sky, sea, coastlines, etc). Accuracy in all the details of the ship above all was of the utmost importance in ship portraits.

Paintings of ships at sea fell into two categories. Paintings of large, full-rigged vessels (such as naval vessels), and paintings of smaller vessels. The former had more prestige and was more expensive, while the later was much easier to come by and generally cheaper. Artists didn't necessarily choose larger or smaller vessels based the skill involved, as their location was often a factor. While some artists worked on/amongst large vessels (traveling with explorers, for example), others worked primarily on the coasts, and so would encounter fishing vessels and the like more frequently than war vessels and such.

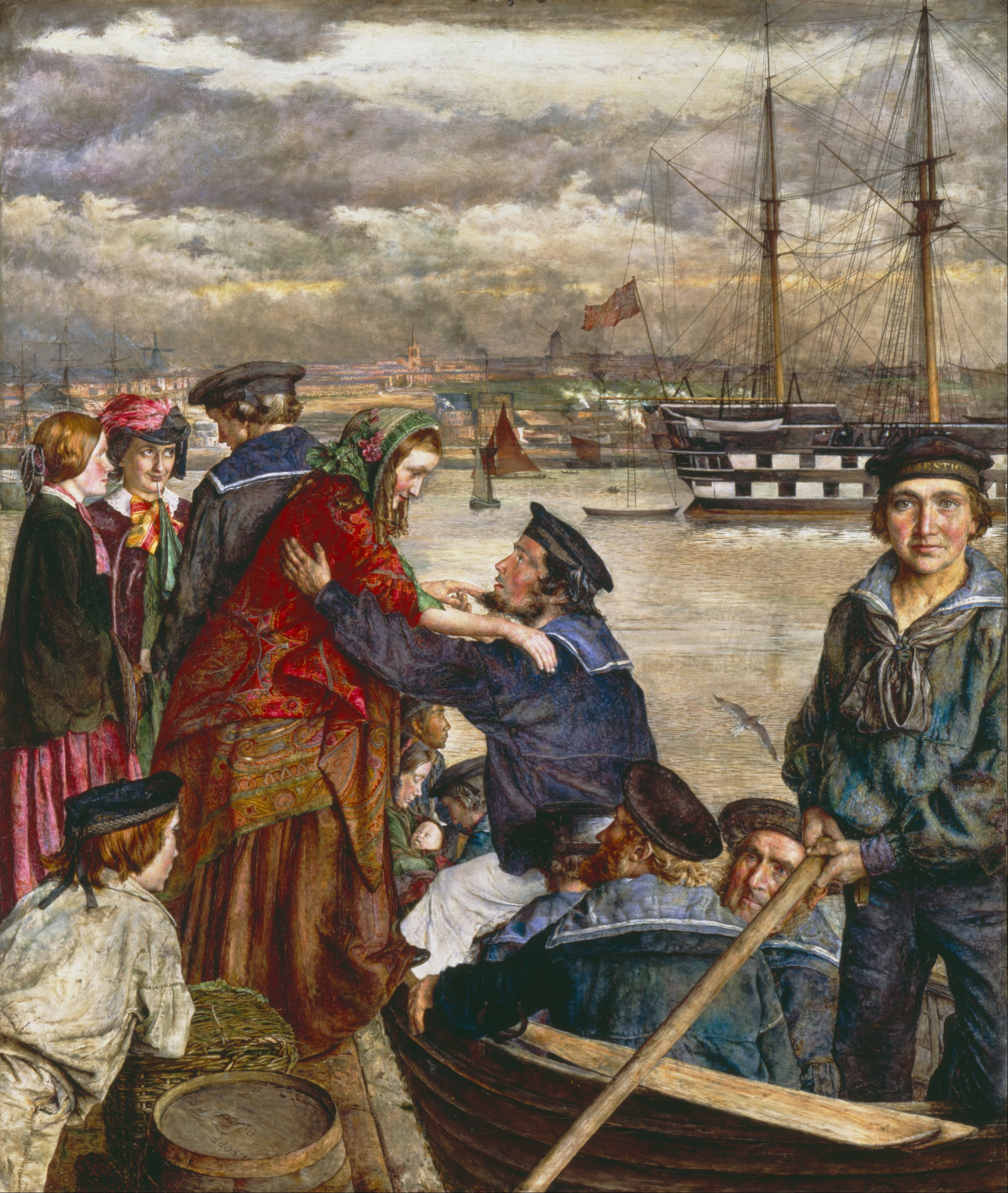
Sweethearts and Wives (1860), a harbour scene by the pre-Raphaelite, John Lee

Inshore, coastal and harbour scenes were often paintings of smaller vessels, and were (again) more common than paintings of large ships at sea. Coastal pictures offer more possibilities for painters in their depiction of the scene since the depth, quality, and surrounding land of the harbours/coastal areas was much more variant than the monotonous, albeit impressive deep sea.

== Standards ==
Since marine artists in the Romantic era varied in technical knowledge (as noted earlier), there seems to have been a certain amount of debate about how an artist should balance aesthetic/artistic qualities with accuracy in their pictures. This stands in contrast to earlier marine painting (most often in the form of ship portraits for seamen and officers), which was judged solely by accuracy and not valued for artistic quality. The knowledge required for accuracy wasn't necessarily easy to come by. The standards outlined in the Liber Nauticus by Dominic and John Thomas Serres makes clear the level of expertise some expected in marine art. In this instruction manual on how to create marine art, the Serreses' declared: "many are the obstacles to the attainment of a proficiency in drawing Marine subjects, particularly as it is not only requisite that a person desirous of excelling in the Art should possess a knowledge of the construction of a ship, or of what is denominated Naval Architecture together with the proportion of masts & yards, the width & cut of the sails, &c; but he should likewise be acquainted with Seamanship". A certain expectation of accuracy is also expressed in a review of two different paintings depicting the Glorious First of June (one—more dramatic/fantastical—by Philip de Loutherbourg and the other by Robert Cleveley, who had long worked as a sailor and whose painting is quite a bit more tame if not as artistically skillful) by Anthony Pasquin (John Williams). Pasquin wrote:

Mr. Loutherbourg's picture on this popular subject is too licentious in the points of historic fact to please any nautical observer. Mr. Cleveley's performance did not impress me, instantaneously, with so much pleasure as Mr. Loutherbourg's; but it had this very desirable effect, that my satisfaction was strengthened in proportion as I viewed it. It is evident that this Artist has a far deeper knowledge of his subject than his compeer, and has not violated authenticity upon any material point: he has not painted to amaze but to satisfy: he has grouped both his pictures with an admirable taste; all the minutiae of the marine are vigorously preserved, and the effect of his atmosphere at morning and evening is strictly compatible with truth and harmony.

== Marine Art and the British Public ==
Paintings commissioned by senior naval officers and displayed in the Royal Academy (as were many marine paintings) were not necessarily accessible to the larger British population. However, this does not mean that marine art was confined to the upper classes. Some marine artists and engravers made etchings and aquatints of the pictures bought by art collectors and such, and these copies could be sold to the general public at more affordable prices. Working as a print dealer rarely generated a livable income for artists, but a few found success. Thomas and William Daniell, for example, had a reasonable amount of success selling aquatints to the public and to book publishers.

== Influence in America ==
Various English artists influenced the tradition of American marine art, most notably Thomas Butterworth, whose battles of naval depictions during the War of 1812 became very popular among American art collectors. Although Butterworth may have never actually gone there, his work reached America thanks to aquatints of his works done by the English engraver Joseph Jeakes. So, just as aquatints made British marine art accessible to the general British population, they made British marine art accessible to the American population across the Atlantic. Another British influence on American marine art was Robert Salmon, who began his career in England in 1800, but ended up moving to America and bringing along with him a British "topographical style" which the younger artists then in New England.

== Major British Marine Artists ==
Notable British marine artists from the Romantic Era include William Anderson, Robert Cleveley, Thomas Luny, George Chambers, Nicholas Pocock, William Hodges, and Philip de Loutherbourg among others.

== See also ==
- Marine Art
- Seascape
- Category:Marine artists
- Category:Maritime paintings
