= William Davis (artist) =

Irish artist

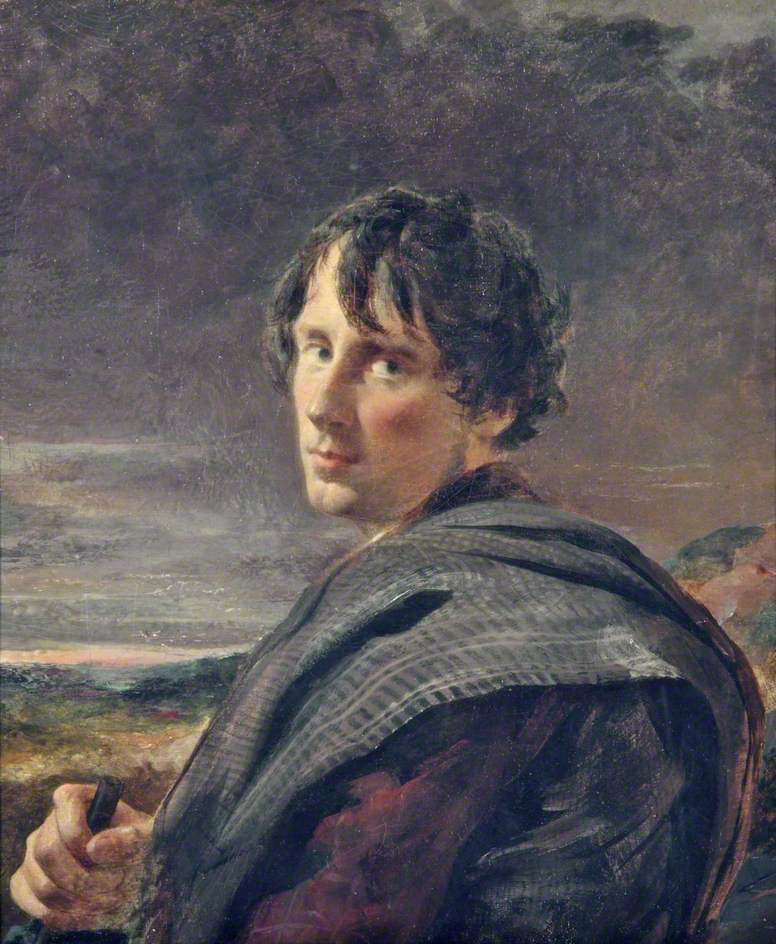
- Self portrait (c. 1852)
- Born: August 1812; Dublin, Ireland
- Died: 22 April 1873 (aged 60); London
- Occupation: Painter
- Children: Lucien Davis; Val Davis

William Davis (August 1812–22 April 1873) was an Irish artist, and part of a group of Liverpool based artists who were influenced by the Pre-Raphaelite style of painting. He mostly painted landscapes.

== Life ==
View from Bidston Hill (1856-1865)

William Davis was born in Dublin in August 1812. No details about his family are known but that his father was a solicitor and Davis initially planned to train as a solicitor as well. He received his artistic education at the Dublin Society Schools.

From the mid-1830s, Davis exhibited with the Royal Hibernian Academy three times before he moved to Sheffield in 1837, and later Liverpool in 1842. There he began to exhibit in the Liverpool Academy, becoming a member in 1854 and professor of drawing. In 1851, he started to exhibit at the Royal Academy of Arts (RA) in London. Originally painting still lives in 1853 he began producing landscapes, having been influenced by his friend and fellow painter, Robert Tonge. His work was admired by Dante Gabriel Rossetti and Ford Madox Brown, through which he was asked to join the Hogarth Club. He exhibited regularly with the RA and Liverpool Academy until 1872, he also exhibited in Manchester and Leeds. Rossetti described him as "modest hard-working man, and an artist of uncommon gifts".

He refused to work with dealers, preferring private patrons, which meant his financial and reputational success was limited. Among his patrons was the Liverpool merchant, John Miller.

Davis married in 1853, having met his wife on a trip back to Ireland. He left his widow and ten children in financial difficulties when he died on 22 April 1873 in London. One obituary stated: "by his more successful works I believe he will one day be accounted worthy of a place among our truest and most original landscape painters." Three of his children, Valentine (1854–1930), William Paul (b. 1856) and Lucien (1860–1951), also became painters. Works by Davis are held in the Walker Art Gallery, Liverpool, and the Williamson Art Gallery, Birkenhead.

== See also ==
- List of Pre-Raphaelite paintings - including the work of William Davis.
- William Lindsay Windus
- Daniel Alexander Williamson
- James Campbell
- John Lee
