= Death of Cook =

Paintings depicting a 1779 event

Death of Cook is the name of several paintings depicting the 1779 death of the first European visitor to the Hawaiian Islands, Captain James Cook at Kealakekua Bay. Most of these paintings seem to go back to an original by John Cleveley the Younger, painted in 1784, although other versions, like that of John Webber, stood model for later copies too. Such artworks were reproduced in paint and engraving over the course of modern world history. The much more famous reproductions, like the one at the Honolulu Museum of Art (allegedly based on the Cleveley version), often depicted Cook as a peacemaker trying to stop the fighting between his sailors and the native Hawaiians that they had challenged in combat.

However, in 2004, the original Cleveley painting was discovered in a private collection belonging to a family since 1851. James, Cleveley's brother was a member of Cook's crew, and the painting is said to concur with his drawings and eyewitness accounts. The original depicted Cook involved in hand-to-hand combat with the native Hawaiians. The discovery of the original painting has not changed the way most historians view Cook's relationship with the Hawaiians, as during his last voyage, Cook was reported by his contemporaries to have become irrationally violent.

The original watercolour painting, together with three others in a series by Cleveley, was put up for auction by Christie's auction house in London in 2004. The lot of four paintings sold for £318,850 (US$572,655).

== Zoffany painting ==
A later painting titled The Death of Captain James Cook, 14 February 1779 by Johann Zoffany was begun in c. 1795 and was the painting owned by Cook's widow. This painting is in the National Maritime Museum.

== Gallery ==
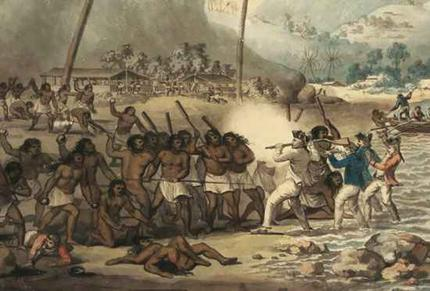
A cropped version of the original painting by Cleveley which was discovered in 2004 and depicts Captain Cook and crew attempting to flee

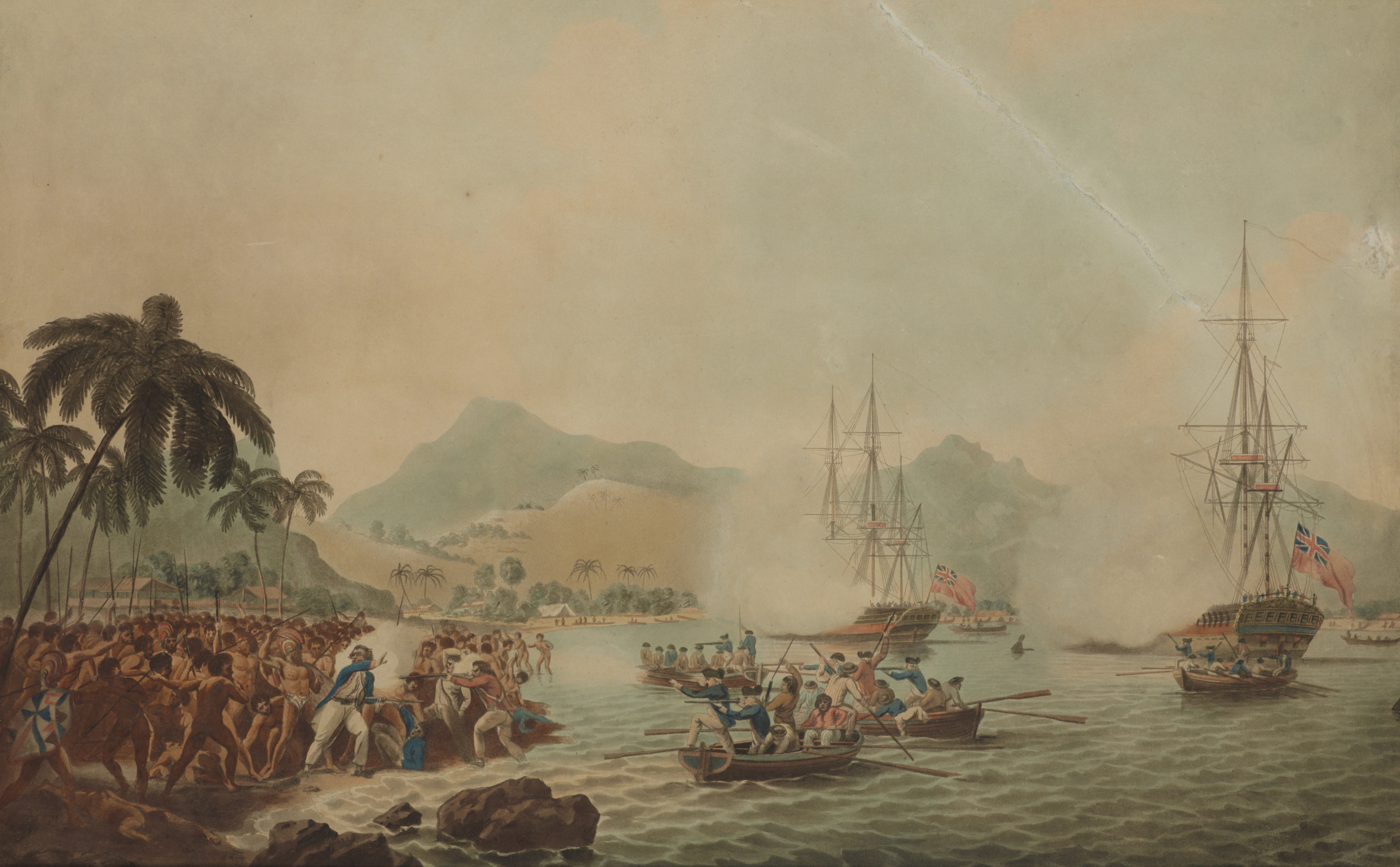
One of the most famous reproductions of 'Death of Captain Cook' by John Cleveley the Younger, Aquatint Francis Jukes. It depicts Cook as a peacemaker

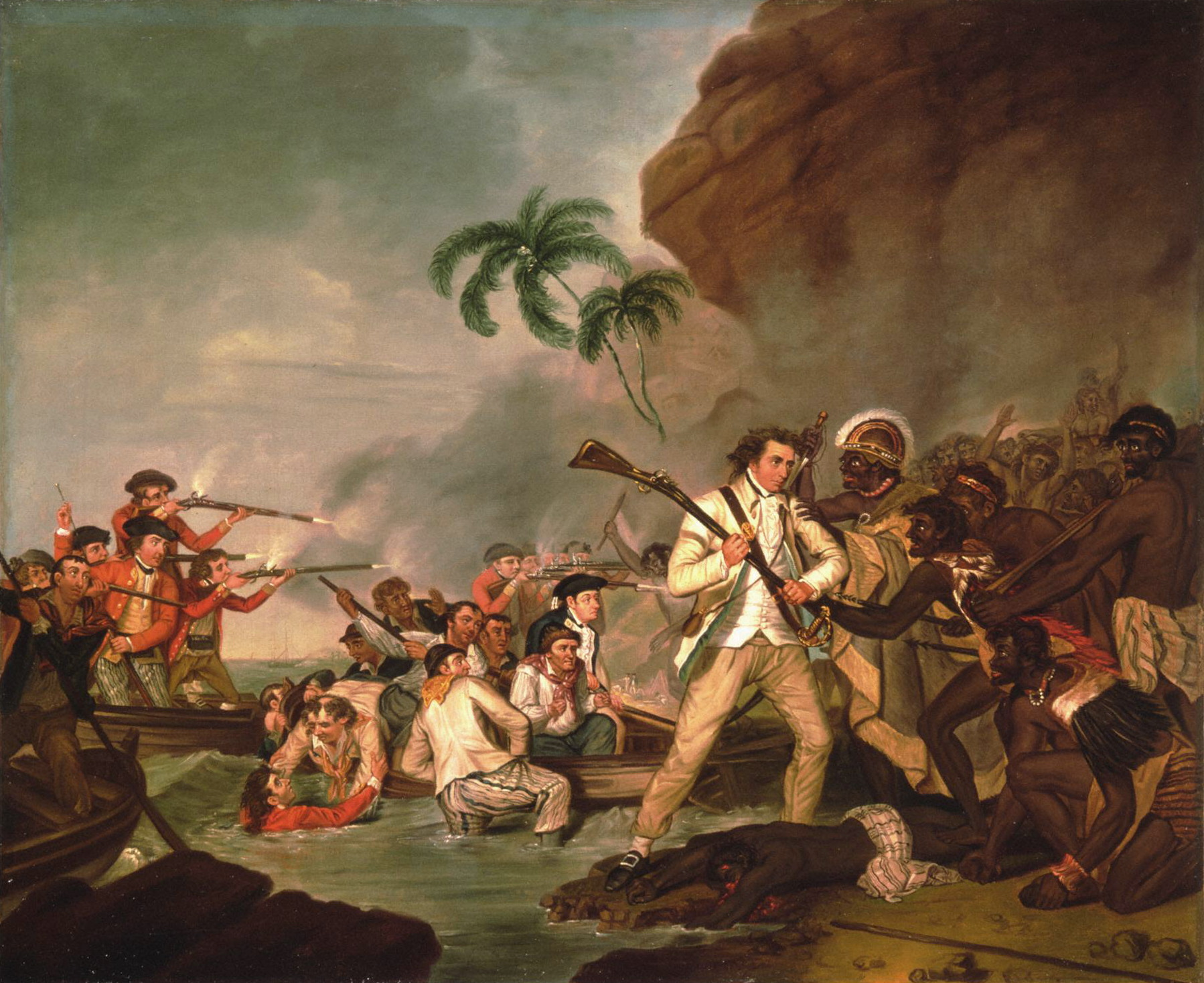
George Carter's 1783 version

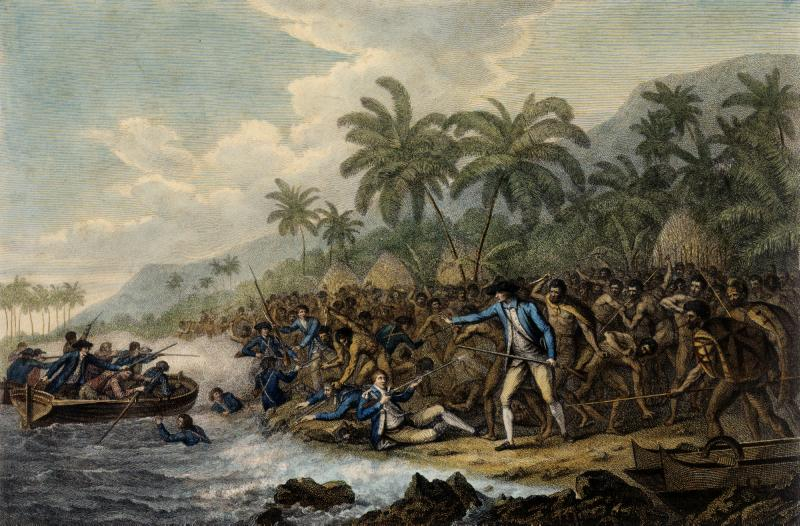
John Webber's 1784 version

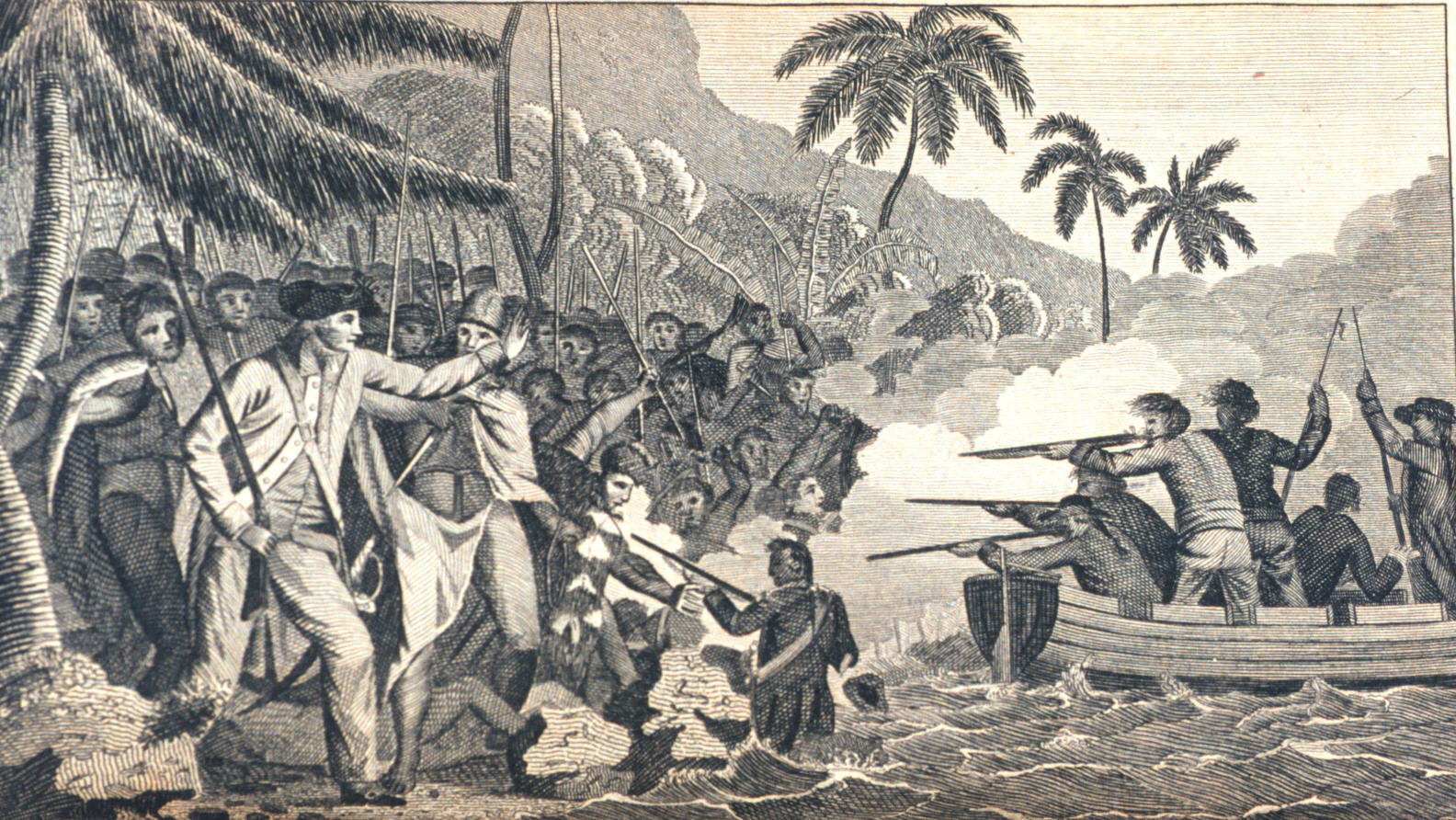
1790 version of Cook's death

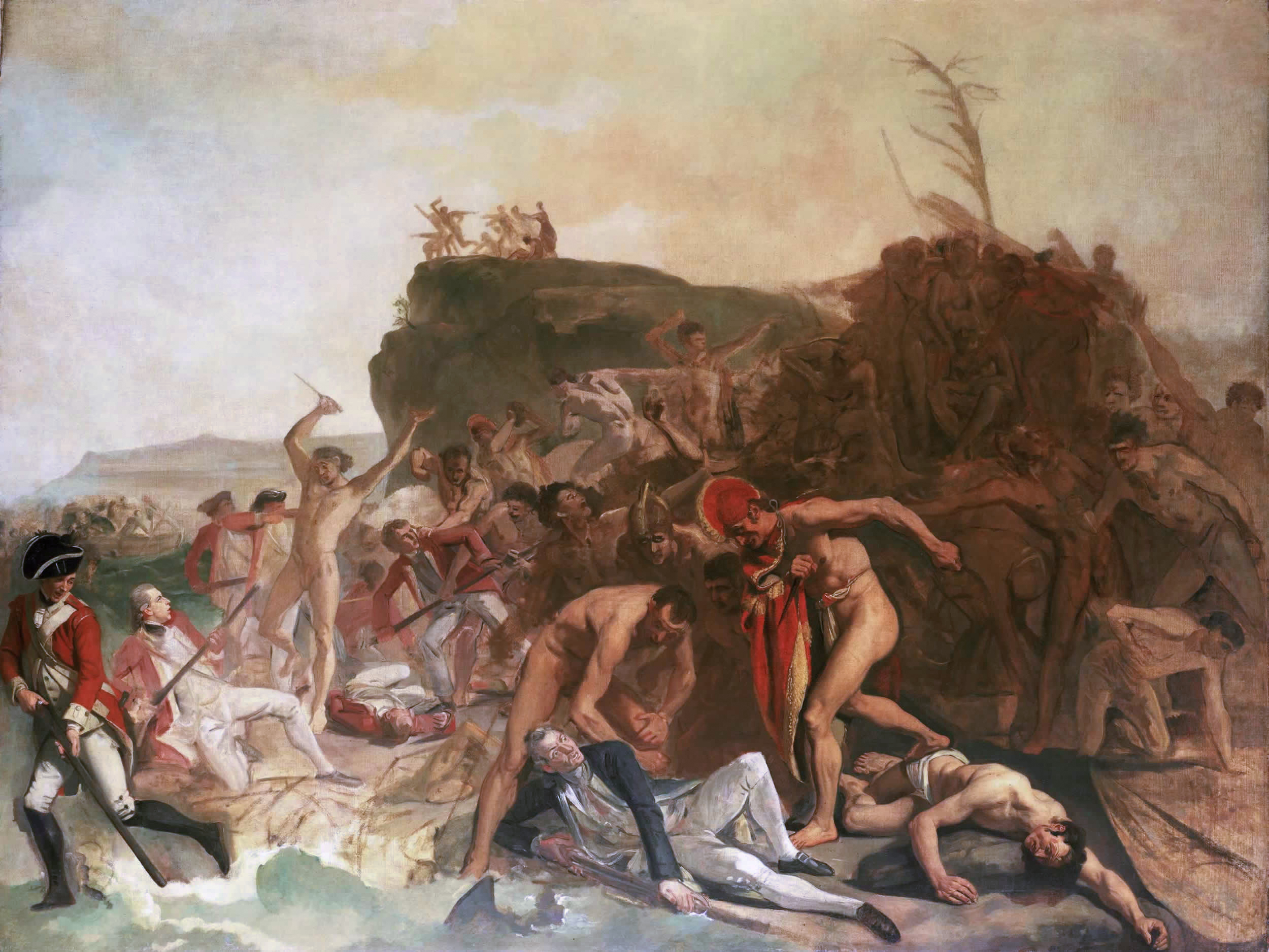
The Death of Captain James Cook, 1794, Johan Zoffany
