= William Lindsay Windus =

English painter

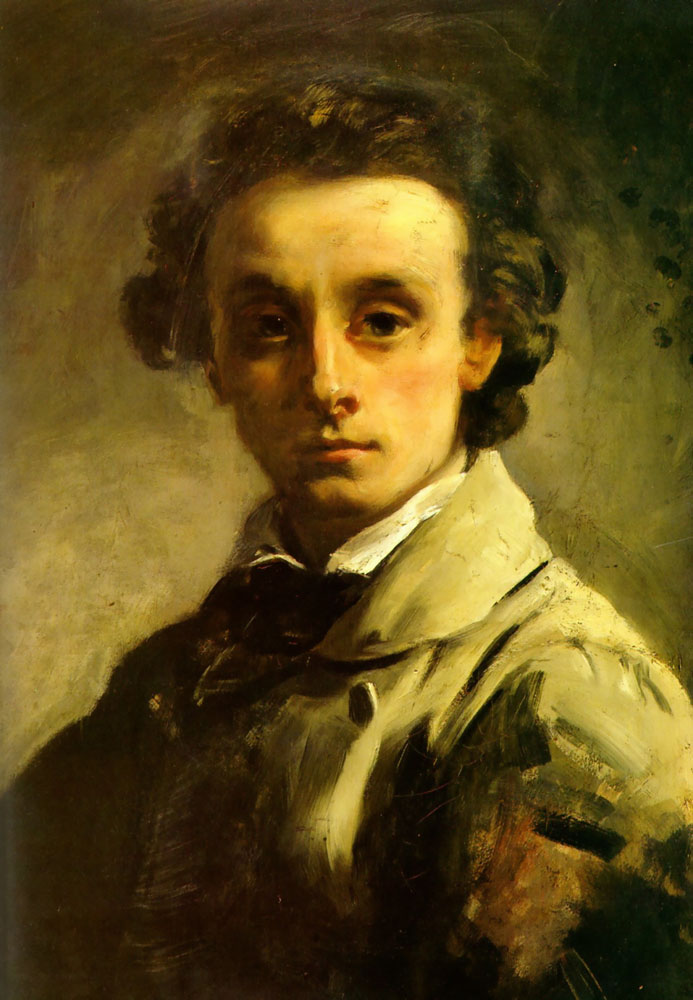
Self portrait (c.1840–c.1845)

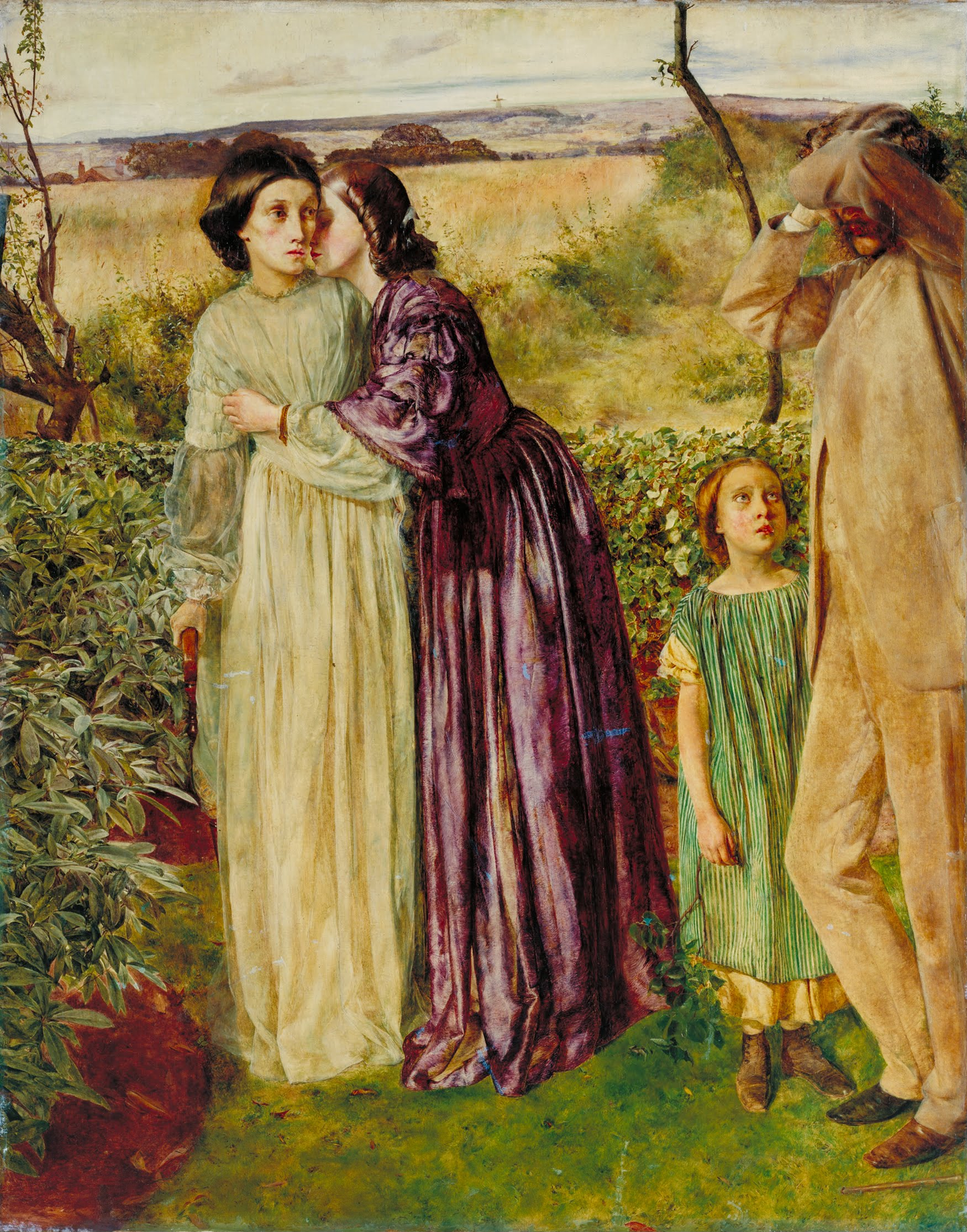
Too Late (1858)

William Lindsay Windus (1822–1907) was an English painter, part of a group of Liverpool painters who were influenced by the Pre-Raphaelite style.

== Life and work ==
He was born in Liverpool, England, was initially taught art by William Daniels (1813–1880), then went on to study at the Liverpool Academy. On a visit to London in 1850 he became converted to the Pre-Raphaelite style. He exhibited his new style of painting with the work Burd Helen at the Royal Academy, London in 1856. The picture caught the eye of Dante Gabriel Rossetti and John Ruskin which helped establish Windus as a respected artist.

Windus's 1844 painting The Black Boy is in the collection of National Museums Liverpool and is displayed at the International Slavery Museum.

== See also ==
- List of Pre-Raphaelite paintings
- Daniel Alexander Williamson
- William Davis
- James Campbell
- John Lee
- Florence Claxton (satirised the works of the Pre-Raphaelites, including Windus, in her painting The Choice of Paris: An Idyll).
