= Lucien Davis =

British artist

- Davis circa 1892
- Born: Joseph Lucien Davis; 1860; Liverpool, England
- Died: 1951 (aged 90–91); Tenterden, Kent
- Occupations: Painter and illustrator
- Parent: William Davis (artist)
- Relatives: Val Davis (sibling)

Lucien Davis (1860–1951) was British painter and illustrator, who worked in the Idyllic school style.

== Life ==
Amazons of the bow (1885)

Joseph Lucien Davis was the son of the Irish Pre-Raphaelite artist, William Davis. He had nine siblings. His older siblings, William Paul and Valentine, were also artists. Davis trained at the Liverpool School of Art and South London School of Technical Art, becoming an illustrator during a boom in illustrated journals and gift books. After qualifying, he also taught in north London for a time.

Davis was known for his pen and ink drawings with careful lines, tonal patterns, and decorative composition, influenced by the Arts and Crafts movement. His work appeared in many periodicals including The Graphic and The Studio. His work covered historical and literary subjects, romantic and pastoral themes, with his work characterised as part of the Idyllic school style of illustration. He also supplied illustrations to Irish publications, as well as illustrating Irish events. A lot of his work for periodicals covered the leisure activities and sports of the upper classes. His work was used in advertisement, most notably for Pears soap.

He exhibited with the Royal Academy between 1885 and 1913. He was a member and exhibited with the Royal Institute of Painters in Water Colours. He also exhibited work with the Fine Art Society, Glasgow Institute of the Fine Arts, Walker Art Gallery, Manchester Academy of Fine Arts, Royal Society of Portrait Painters and the Royal Institute of Oil Painters.

Davis died in Ashford or Tenterden, Kent. His date of death is sometimes given as 1941, and in other sources as 1951.
