= Val Davis =

British artist

- Born: J. Valentine Davis; 1854; Liverpool, England
- Died: 1930 (aged 75–76); London
- Occupations: Painter and illustrator
- Parent: William Davis (artist)
- Relatives: Lucien Davis (brother)

Val Davis (1854–1930) was British painter of genre scenes.

== Life ==
Swans on river oil painting signed Val Davis

John Valentine Davis was born in 1854 in Liverpool. Davis' father was the Irish Pre-Raphaelite artist, William Davis. Some sources identify Davis as a man, and others as a woman. Davis had nine siblings, with William Paul and Lucien, also being artists.

Davis studied under their father, and later with Ford Madox Brown in London. Davis' debut exhibition with the Royal Academy was in 1875, and exhibited there regularly. Davis was elected a member of the Royal Society of British Artists in 1890, and exhibited at the Royal Glasgow Institute of Fine Arts, Royal Birmingham Society of Artists, the Walker Art Gallery, Manchester Academy of Fine Arts, the New Gallery, the Royal Hibernian Academy, Royal Institute of Painters in Water Colours, Royal Society of Miniature Painters, Sculptors and Gravers, and the Royal Institute of Oil Painters. Between 1890 and 1900, Davis lived at 5 Langham Chambers with other artists from the Langham Sketching Club.

Davis died in London in 1930. The Guildhall London and Poole Museum hold examples of Davis' work.
