= The Black Boy =

1844 painting by William Lindsay Windus

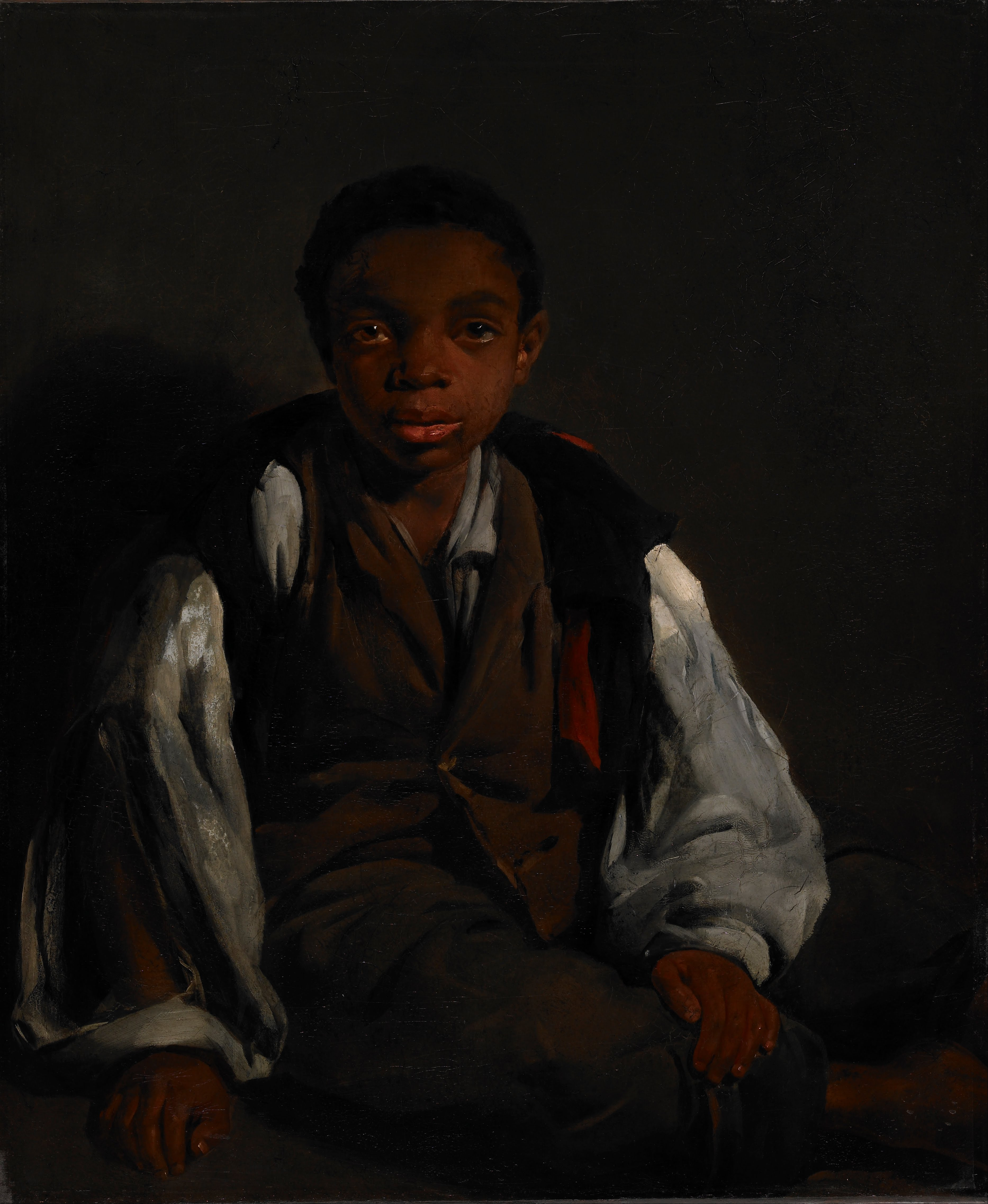
The Black Boy, 1844 by William Lindsay Windus

The Black Boy is an 1844 painting by William Lindsay Windus in the collection of the International Slavery Museum in Liverpool, England.

The painting is an oil on canvas painting measuring 76.1 x 63.5cm and depicts a black child looking at the viewer. He is wearing torn clothing. It is the only portrait painting depicting an individual black child in the collection of the National Museums Liverpool. There are believed to be fewer than 10 individual portraits depicting a single Black figure from the mid-19th century in British national collections.

An X-ray analysis of the painting revealed that four or five other faces were painted by Windus on the canvas before their erasure. An 1891 catalogue listing described the boy as having been a stowaway that Windus had met on the steps of Liverpool's Monument Hotel on the London Road. The listing further described how a passing sailor had seen Windus's completed portrait in a frame maker's shop and reunited the child with his family. The story is believed to have been invented to make it more appealing to wealthy buyers who would have taken pity on the subject.

In 2024 the museum made a public appeal for more information about the child subject.
