= Broughty Wa's =

Traditional song

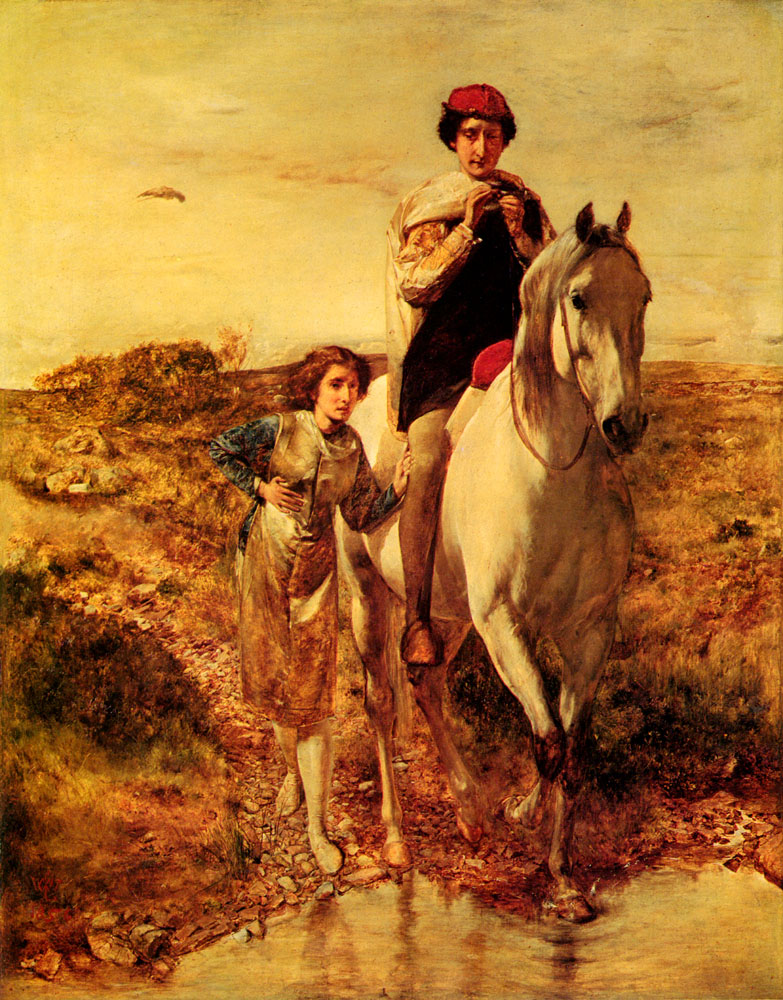
Burd Helen (painting by William Lindsay Windus, 1856.

Broughty Wa's or (Burd) Helen (Child ballad # 258; Roud # 108) is a traditional folk song.

== Synopsis ==
Helen is a beautiful heiress, betrothed to Hazelan. Glenhazlen visits her and is well received, until his men surround her and they carry her off. She laments that the Highlands are not Dundee or the banks of the Tay. One day as they go riding, she throws herself in a stream. He jumps after and is drowned. She swims off and makes her way back to Dundee.

== See also ==
- List of the Child Ballads
- Walter Lesly
