= The Death of Captain James Cook (Zoffany) =

Painting by Johan Zoffany

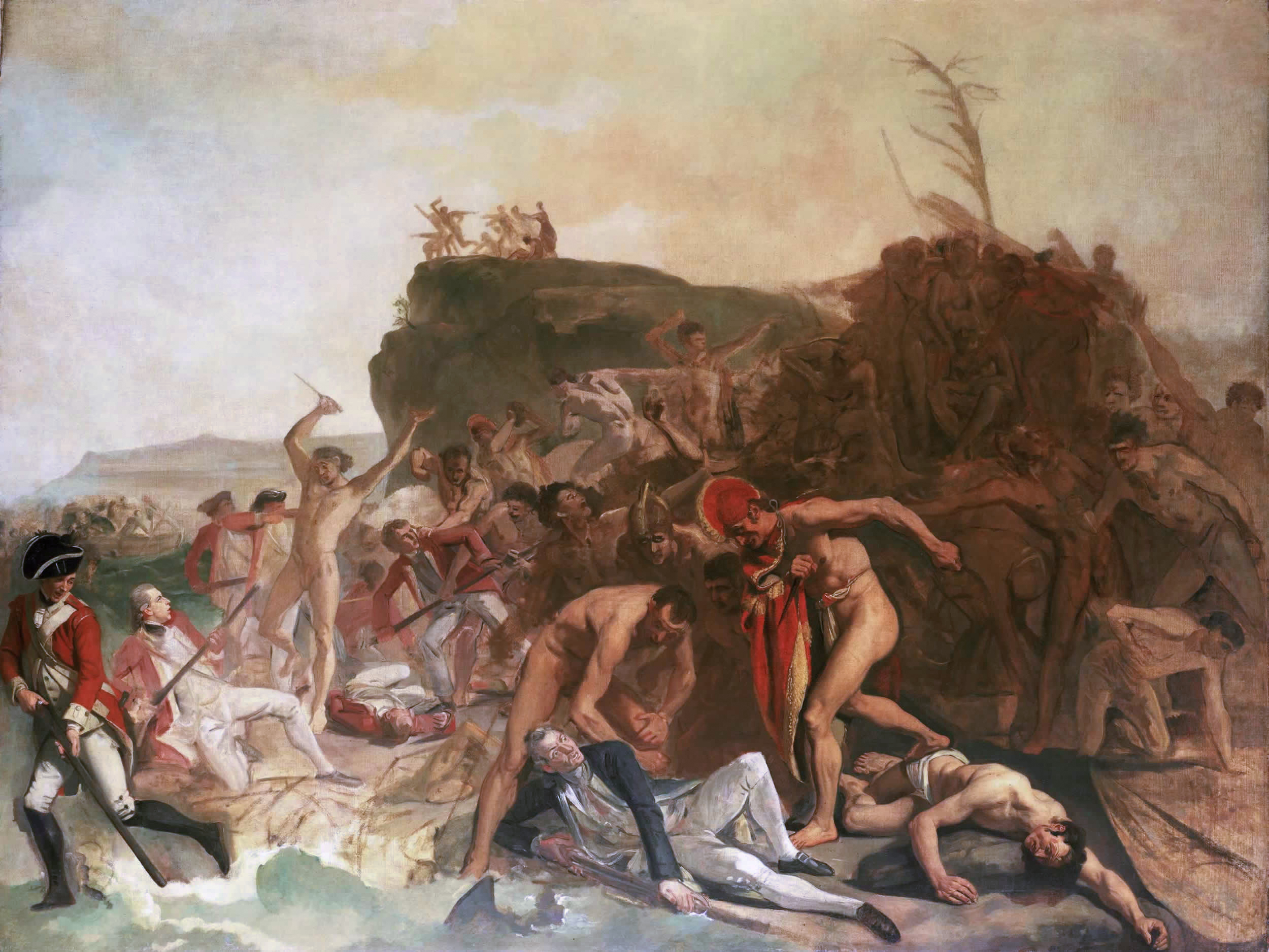
- Artist: Johan Zoffany
- Year: c. 1795
- Type: Oil painting
- Dimensions: 137.2 cm × 182.9 cm (54.0 in × 72.0 in)
- Location: National Maritime Museum, London

The Death of Captain James Cook, 14 February 1779 is an oil-on-canvas painting by the German British artist Johan Zoffany. The painting, which records the loss of the British explorer Captain James Cook, was made in around 1794 or 1795, some years after the death of Cook in Hawaii in 1779. Other paintings of the death of Cook were painted earlier. The Mahiole (Feathered Helmet) that was included in the painting of Cook's death by Zoffany is said to be the helmet given to Cook when he first landed in Hawaii.

== Painting's construction ==
The painting is unfinished. Zoffany is thought to have based the painting on another made of Cook's death by John Webber who was the official artist on Cook's third voyage. Zoffany had been invited at one time to be an artist on one of Cook's voyages and it is thought that he may have previously painted Cook. Webber had not witnessed the death of Cook, but he would have known the English sailors and would also have seen many of the natives. When Cook and his men visited Hawaii for the second time they spent some time on the main island of Hawaii where he had received many gifts from the Hawaiian Chief including a feather cape and feathered helmet. Cook had been killed when he returned to Hawaii only two weeks after his second visit. His unplanned return to the island was due to a storm. Cook angered the native people by attempting to take the local chief, Kalaniʻōpuʻu, as a hostage in order to get a missing boat returned. In the confusion, Cook shot a man and in the aftermath he and four marines were speared to death; the death appears unintended. Cook's replacement, Captain Clerke, was able to very quickly reestablish a relationship with the Hawaiians, and they left with little ill will.

Besides Webber's painting, Zoffany also took poses from Benjamin West's The Death of General Wolfe. The native figure is based on the classical sculpture of the Discobolus which Zoffany knew well, and included in his painting Charles Townley in the Park St. Gallery. Cook's pose derives from the Dying Gaul, another famous classical statue. The Hawaiian helmet that was included in the painting had been borrowed from a London museum and had belonged to Cook. It was the helmet given to Cook by a Hawaiian chief on his first visit to Hawaii in 1778. The helmet is also reminiscent of a crested Ancient Greek helmet.

== History ==
Johann Zoffany was a German-born painter who had become a successful portrait painter in London. Among his principal patrons were the royal family. Queen Charlotte had sent Zoffany to Florence where he had agreed to paint the Tribuna of the Uffizi. Zoffany stayed seven years and the resulting painting was not well received.

Zoffany had to leave the country and he never again got a royal commission. He had hoped to sail with Captain Cook, but as a second choice he elected to make the long journey to Lucknow where he painted the life in colonial India. Whilst Zoffany was in India he worked with William Hodges. The construction of this painting is said to be based on a sketch by Hodges.

Zoffany went to see a play at Covent Garden concerning the death of Captain Cook, who had been killed in Hawaii on his third voyage to find the North-West Passage in 1779. This is thought to have inspired him to paint the death of Cook at the hand of the Hawaiian natives. Cook had been given a mahiole (feathered helmet) and a feather cloak which was given to the Leverian Museum. Zoffany borrowed these as props for the construction of the painting which was not intended to be accurate and included poses that were taken from classic statues. This helmet remained in Sir Ashton Lever's collection, which was originally housed in Leicester Square. The feathered helmet that had been given to Cook and included in this painting is now in a museum in Vienna.

When Cook visited Hawaii for the first time in January 1778. Cook was received by high chief Kalaniʻōpuʻu. Kalaniʻōpuʻu had with him six feather cloaks and a helmet. At the end of the meeting Cook was given the helmet and cloak that Kalaniʻōpuʻu had been wearing. On the expedition's return much of Cook's collection was exhibited in the Leverian Museum. Lever's collection was then disposed of by public lottery, was obtained by James Parkinson, and was exhibited in the Blackfriars Rotunda. He eventually sold this collection in 7,000 separate lots, in 1806. The British Museum failed to bid on these items as Sir Joseph Banks had advised them that there was nothing of value. Many items were purchased by Baron Leopold von Fichtel for the museum in Vienna.

== Provenance ==
Zoffany's painting was obtained in its unfinished state by Cook's widow. When she died in 1835 the painting was not mentioned specifically and it was left to John Leach Bennet who gave it to Greenwich Hospital. The painting is in the collection of the National Maritime Museum in Greenwich, London.
