= Walter Lesly =

Traditional song

- Catalogue: Roud 3925, Child 296
- Genre: Folk; Ballad
- Language: Scottish English
- Composed: Before 1800
- Published: 1828

"Walter Lesly" (Roud 3925, Child 296) is a traditional English-language folk ballad.

== Synopsis ==
Walter Lesly asks a lady to come to Conland. Then his kinsmen, led by Geordy Lesly, carry her off. A wedding feast is ready, and they are put in bed together. When he is asleep, she gets up, dresses, and runs off, swearing to deal no more with him. It concludes with the observation that he was not interested in either her looks or her noble blood, but only her money.

== Origins ==
The ballad had previously been published in Peter Buchan's Ancient Ballads and Songs of the North of Scotland (published in 1828).

== See also ==
- List of the Child Ballads
- Broughty Wa's
