= John Cleveley the Younger =

English painter

John Cleveley the Younger (25 December 1747 – 25 June 1786) was a British artist and marine painter.

== Life and work ==
Cleveley was the son of John Cleveley the Elder. He and his twin brother Robert were both, like their father, marine painters. John and Robert were both brought up and trained in dockyards, but (particularly by producing pictures especially for print reproduction) addressed much wider audiences with their art than their father had done.

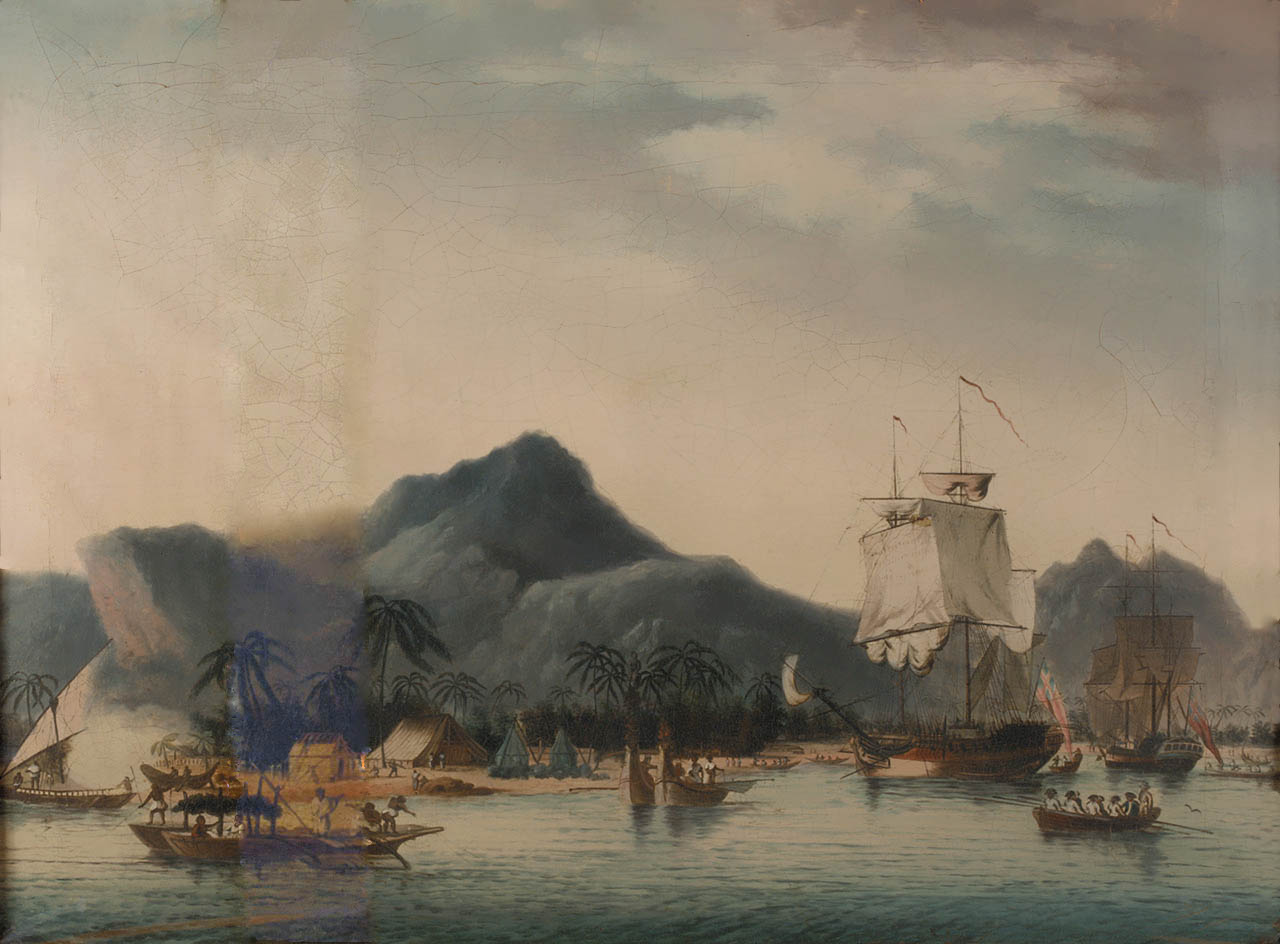
The Resolution and Discovery off Hawaii (BHC1838), by John Cleveley the Younger (NMM)

He trained under the artist Paul Sandby at Woolwich. He was Joseph Banks' draughtsman on his journey to the Hebrides, Orkney, and Iceland, his sketches were worked into watercolour, some of which were placed with the British Museum. John was employed to turn drawings made on Captain Cook’s second voyage to the South Seas (1772–75) into engravings, and later also got access to some of the art produced on the third voyage, 1776-80 (via drawings and eyewitness accounts made by his brother James, who was a carpenter on the third voyage). Despite going on neither expedition personally, John moved fast to cash in on the new demand for South Seas images, producing images for the print market such as the Death of Cook, and HMS Resolution and HMS Discovery at Moorea.

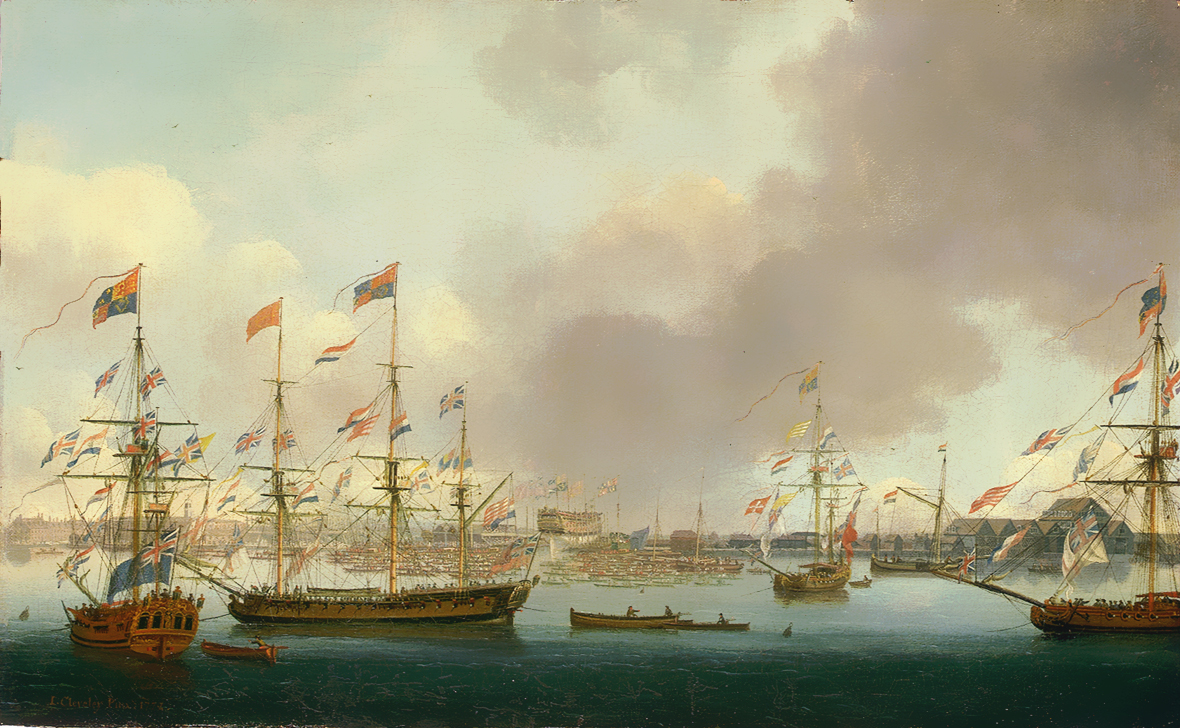
Launch of HMS Alexander at Deptford in 1778 (BHC1875), by John Cleveley the Younger (NMM)

John the Younger painted the Royal Dockyards at Deptford, Woolwich and Chatham (e.g. the hand-coloured print A view of His Majesty’s dockyard at Chatham, showing a naval ship being floated out, a launching scene common in the work of both father and son; and Launch of HMS Alexander at Deptford in 1778). However, John the Younger's launch scenes abandon John the Elder's documentary style and its stiffness, and instead show a more atmospheric, open view, with low horizons reminiscent of 17th-century Dutch Golden Age marine art. The son's range of subjects was also far wider.
