= Robert Cleveley =

English painter

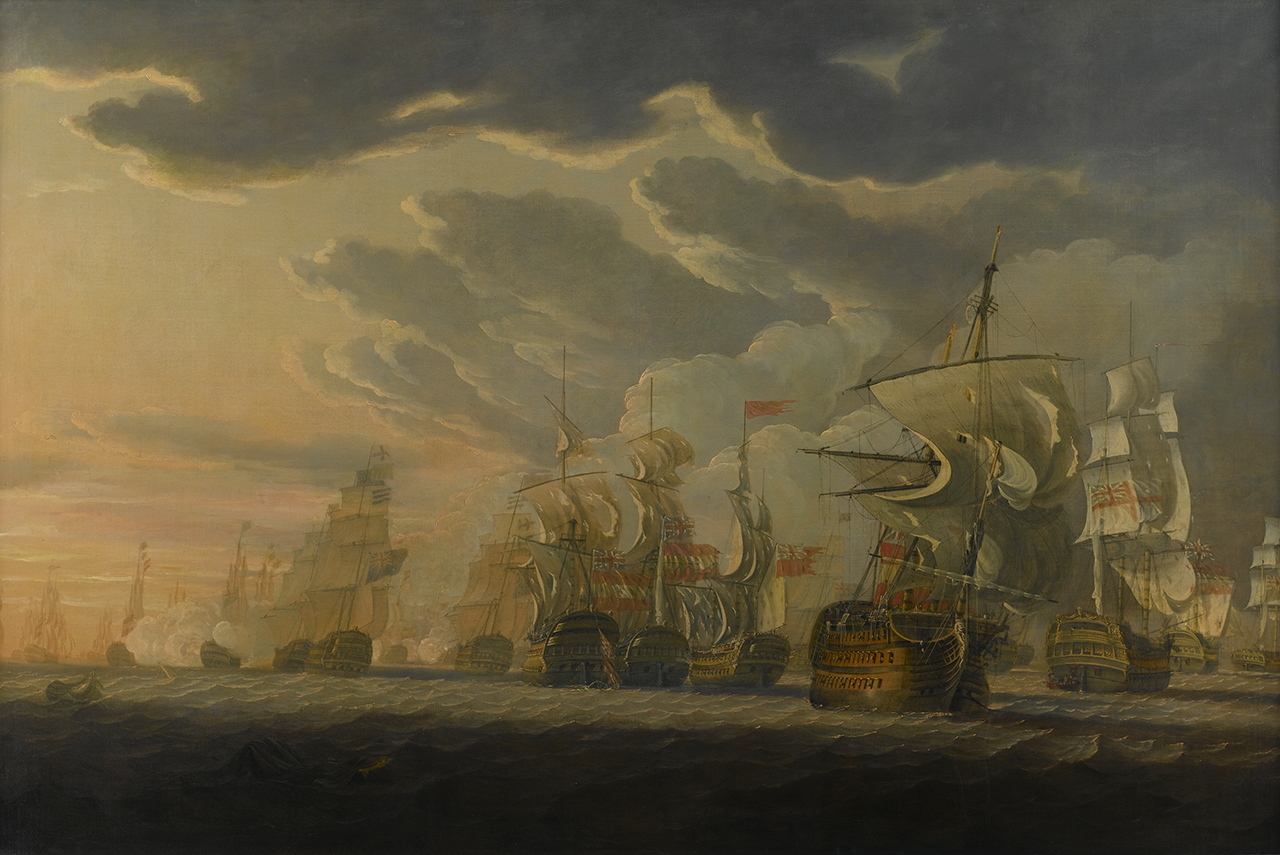
The Battle of Cape St. Vincent, by Robert Cleveley

Robert Cleveley (1747 – 28 September 1809) was an English painter who specialised in marine art.

His father and twin brother (John Cleveley the Elder, c.1712–1777, and John Cleveley the Younger, 1747–1786) were also artists, with John the Younger (and possibly Robert too, to judge from his style) gaining some training in watercolours from Paul Sandby, previously a teacher at the Royal Military Academy, Woolwich.

John the Elder had tried and failed to make a living in working in a dockyard, and so did Robert, as a caulker. However, mocked by other dockyard workers for wearing gloves whilst working, John did not enjoy his time there, giving it up and in 1770 volunteering for the navy as a clerk. His first service as a clerk was briefly under Captain William Locker (who acted as patron to artists probably known to John the Elder), then soon afterwards under Captain George Vandeput on his voyage in the Asia to the West Indies and North America, during which time Vandeput became a lifelong friend. The Asia returned in 1777, and from then to the end of his life Robert followed a double career as purser on board various ships stationed in the Home Fleet (though most probably exercising his functions through a deputy for some or all of the time) and as a marine painter. This meant he could exhibit his works as "Robert Cleveley of the Royal Navy".

First exhibiting at the Royal Academy in 1780, his specialism was naval battles (though he also produced pictures of royal naval occasions, such as his "View of the Fleet at Spithead Saluting George III at his Review in 1793", now at the National Maritime Museum) and many of his works were reproduced as engravings. Like his brother John, he also exploited their brother James' presence as a carpenter on Captain Cook's third voyage to gain access to art produced on the voyage and to produce art to cash in on the popular demand for South Sea images (e.g. a 1789 print of A view of Botany Bay).

He did, however, still make occasional voyages with Vandeput, such as when he served as ‘assistant to the clerk of the kitchen’ in the royal entourage when the royal yacht Princess Augusta (under Vandeput) took Prince William Henry, later Duke of Clarence, to Hanover in July and August 1783. This moving in royal circles later brought him an appointment as Marine Draughtsman, first to the Duke of Clarence and then to the Prince Regent. He died in 1809 in Dover after accidentally falling down a cliff.

== Gallery ==
Destruction of French fleet off the Nile (1798) in the collection at The Mariners' Museum

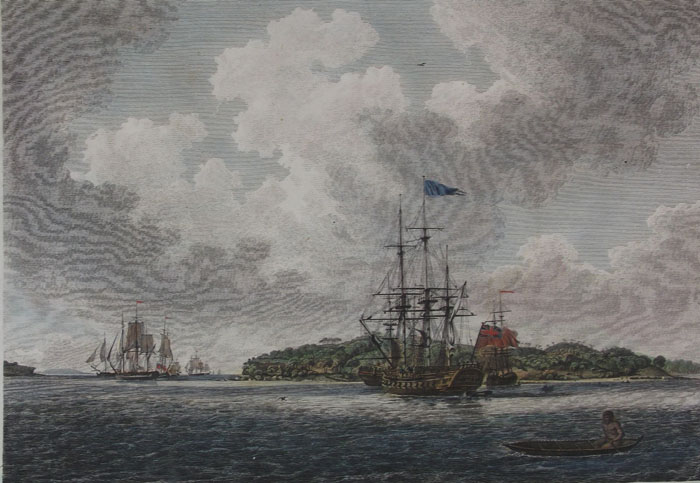
A view of Botany Bay (1789) in the collection at The Mariners' Museum

View in Port Jackson (1789) in the collection at The Mariners' Museum
