= John Cleveley the Elder =

English painter

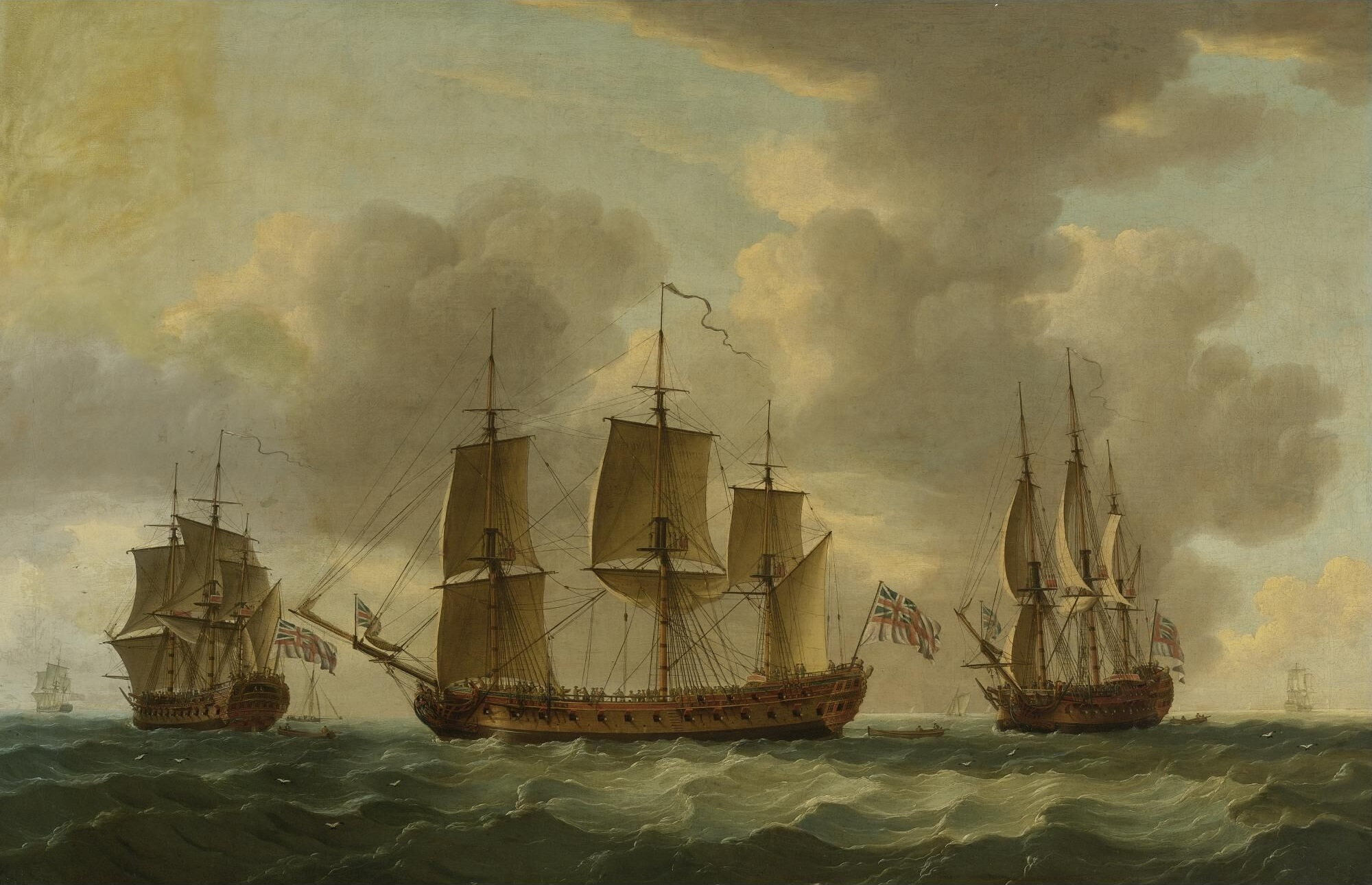
The Frigate H.M.S. Pallas in three positions (1769)

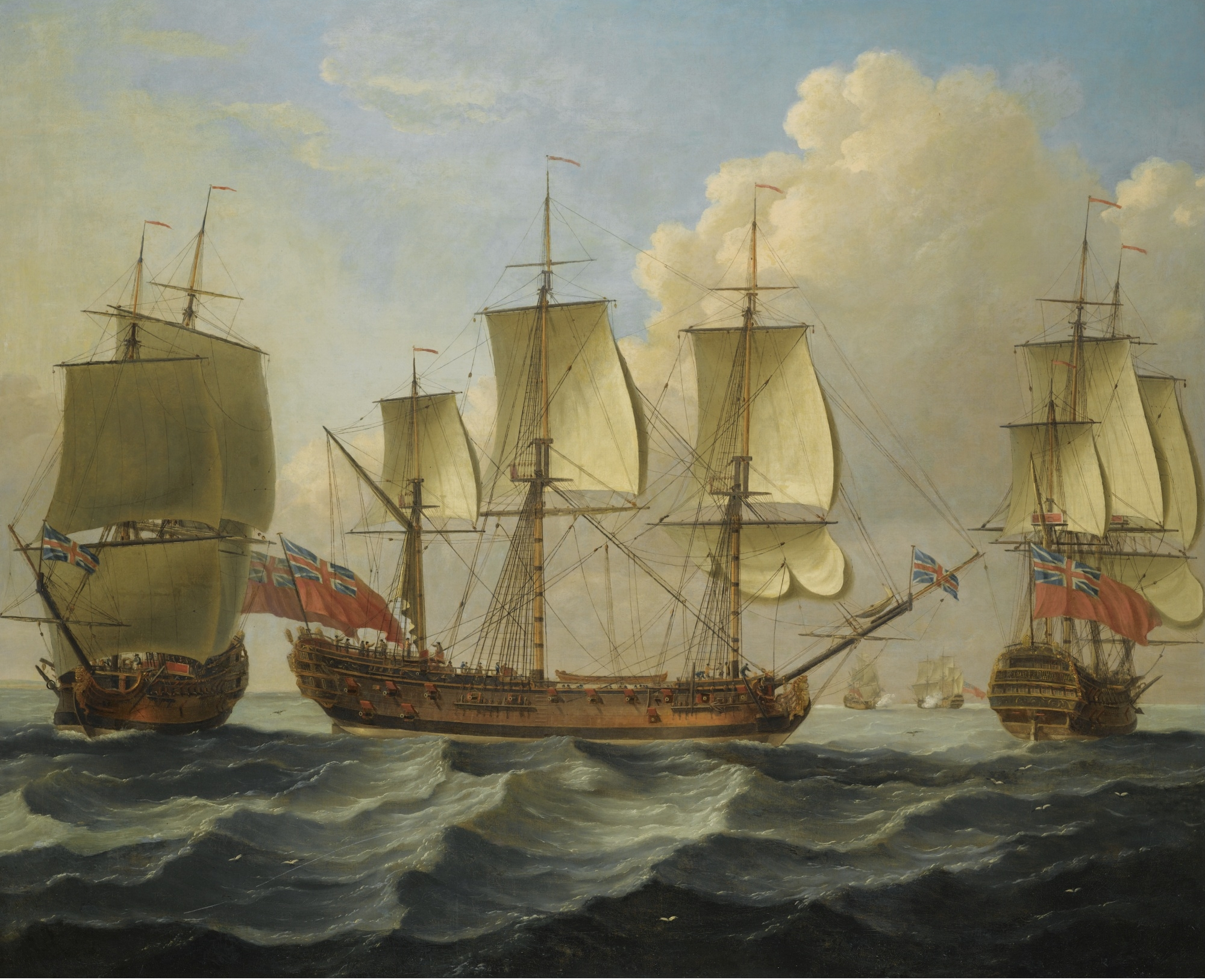
An East Indiaman in three positions

John Cleveley the Elder (c. 1712 – 21 May 1777) was an English painter who specialised in marine art.

== Life ==
Cleveley was born in Southwark. He was not from an artistic background, and his father intended him to follow the family trade of joinery, so he set up as a carpenter or shipwright in around 1742 at the Deptford Dockyard. Continuing his work in that area throughout his life (indeed, he is referred to as ‘carpenter belonging to His Majesty’s Ship Victory, in the pay of His M[ajest]ys Navy’ in letters of administration granted by the Admiralty in 1778 to his widow, probably when she was first fitting out), from about 1745 he also worked as a painter, mostly ship portraits, dockyard scenes of shipbuilding and launches, and some other marine views. They combined his knowledge of shipbuilding with accurate architectural and topographical detail. Apparently mostly self-taught, it is possible that dockyard ship-painters also gave him some training in this area. He toured East Anglia, and produced some paintings from notes made on that trip.

== Works ==
- Sixth-Rate on the Stocks, now in the National Maritime Museum, London.
- The Royal Yacht Caroline (National Maritime Museum, London).
- HMS Royal George off Deptford at the launch of HMS Cambridge, 1755, (though the former ship was only launched a year later, and would have been of too deep a draught to appear where it does) (National Maritime Museum, London).
- The theme for a series of six paintings, displayed in the parlour of one of the survivors of the Luxborough Galley, was repeated in The Loss of the 'Luxborough' Galley in 1727 and the Escape of Some of her Crew (Greenwich Hospital coll., National Maritime Museum, London).

== Children ==
- John Cleveley the Younger (1747–1786) and Robert Cleveley (1747–1809), twins, both artists
- James Cleveley, ship's carpenter on HMS Resolution during Cook’s last Pacific voyage, 1776–1780.
