= Daniel Alexander Williamson =

English painter

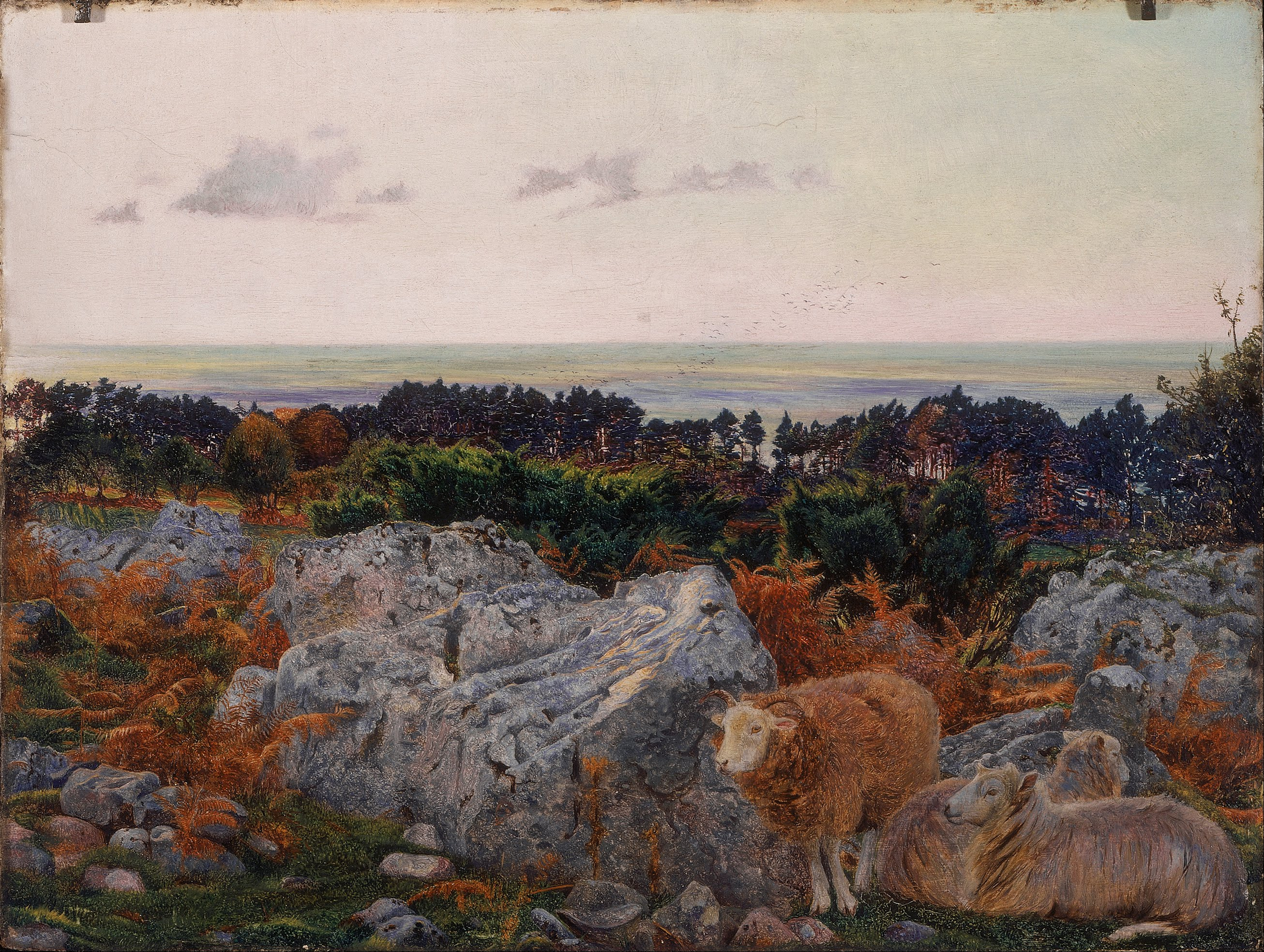
Morecambe Bay from Warton Crag, 1862

Daniel Alexander Williamson (1823–1903) was an English Victorian painter, mostly of landscapes, part of a group of Liverpool painters who were influenced by the Pre-Raphaelite style.

He lived and worked in London from 1849 to 1857, before returning north to the Lancashire village of Warton. He went on regular painting trips with fellow Liverpool artist, William Lindsay Windus.

Several of his oil paintings are in UK public art collections, including National Museums Liverpool.

== See also ==
- List of Pre-Raphaelite paintings - including the works of Daniel Alexander Williamson.
