= John Robertson (mathematician) =

John Robertson (1712–1776) was an English mathematician, and a Fellow, clerk and librarian of the Royal Society. His book The Elements of Navigation became a classic textbook.

== Life ==
Initially apprenticed to a trade, Robertson became a teacher of mathematics. He was elected a Fellow of the Royal Society in 1741. In 1747 he was appointed master of the Royal Mathematical School at Christ's Hospital, assistant there to James Hodgson.

In 1755 Robertson became first master of the Royal Naval Academy, Portsmouth. Having lost this appointment in 1766 through intrigues of the second master, he returned to London, and was appointed clerk and librarian to the Royal Society on 7 January 1768. This post he held till his death, on 11 December 1776.

== Writings and scientific work ==
Robertson published his first book Completed Treatise on Mensuration in 1739 and was subsequently elected a fellow of the Royal Society in 1741. In 1747 he published the first edition of A Treatise of Such Mathematical Instruments as are Usually put into a Portable Case, which went through four editions in the coming 30 years and became a text book at the Royal Mathematical School and the Royal Navy Academy.

Since the opening of the Royal Mathematical School its masters wrote high quality mathematical textbooks. In this tradition Robertson wrote the two volume book The Elements of Navigation Containing the Theory and Practice, with the Necessary Tables and Compendiums for Finding the Latitude and Longitude as Sea, to which is Added a Treatise on Marine Fortification. The first edition was published in 1754, and The Elements of Navigation went through seven editions in fifty years. The first volume included sections on logarithms, Euclidean geometry, plane trigonometry, spherics, geography, plane sailing, oblique sailing, current sailing, globular sailing, parallel sailing, middle latitudes and Mercator's sailing, great circular sailing, astronomy, use of globes, as well as estimating distances and fortification.

Pupils were prepared for the Royal Navy and the standards of mathematics at the Royal Mathematical School was high. A similar curriculum was followed at the Royal Navy Academy, of which Robertson became a mathematics master in 1755. His edition of The Elements of Navigation was used by Royal Mathematical School pupils on a daily basis between 1755 and 1775. By 1776 the book was regarded a classic, and among the finest English language navigation educational manuals of its time. After Robertson moved to the Royal Navy Academy in 1755 The Elements of Navigation shaped the mathematical and navigational curricula of that institution. In 1773 the two schools were described as the two best mathematics schools in England. When Robertson died in 1777 William Wales decided to revise the book and under the same title an edition was published in 1780 attributed to Robertson and Wales.

In 1750 Robertson published A Translation of De La Caille's Elements of Astronomy and he published nine papers in the Philosophical Transactions between 1750 and 1772. These were On Logarithmic Tangents, On Logarithmic Lines on Gunter's Scale, On Extraordinary Phenomena in Portsmouth Harbour, On the Specific Gravity of Living Men, On the Fall of Water under Bridges, On Circulating Decimals, On the Motion of a Body deflected by Forces from Two Fixed Points, and On Twenty Cases of Compound Interest

After losing his position at the Royal Naval Academy in 1766 Robertson was appointed as a clerk and librarian to the Royal Society, positions which he held until his death. He continued his scientific practice and was the first to be show that stereographic projection from the sphere is a conformal map projection. In 1775 he produced the first slide rule with a runner attached. Robertson also calibrated John Harrison's chronometer H4 before it was first trialled at sea in November 1761. He was greatly respected and was consulted for the surveying of the Mason–Dixon line between Maryland and Pennsylvania in North America.

== Family ==
Robertson was married, and his wife was left with eight children when he died. She worked for the Royal Society as housekeeper. The eldest son of the marriage, worked as Royal Society librarian.
