= Volunteer-per-order =

Historical rating in the British Royal Navy

Volunteer-per-order was a naval rating for young gentlemen seeking a future career as officers in the Royal Navy between 1676 and 1837. Participants were guaranteed access to junior officer ranks after between two and five years study and practical experience. From 1676 to 1732, volunteers-per-order were also known as King's Letter Boys as their guarantee of a place in naval service was via a letter from the monarch.

== Structure ==
The rating was introduced by Samuel Pepys in 1676 and the recipient received £24 a year and a letter from the crown which virtually guaranteed him promotion after spending two years at sea and passing the examination for lieutenant. The letter instructed the admirals and captains that the bearer was to be shown "such kindness as you shall judge fit for a gentleman, both in accommodating him in your ship and in furthering his improvement". Volunteers-per-order took the place of a midshipman on board the ship, which originally was a post for an experienced seaman. Because of their higher social class and the aforementioned letter, they were nicknamed "King's Letter boys"to distinguish them from rest of the crew.

From 1733, young men seeking to become volunteers-per-order were required to study for three years at the Royal Naval Academy at Portsmouth, and their subsequent time at sea was reduced from two years to one. This change lifted education standards but restricted volunteer-per-order position to those who could afford three year's tuition fees. The reduction in sea time also reduced practical experience and the volunteer's opportunity to make contacts and win favour from senior officers. The annual Naval Academy intake was limited to 40 volunteers per year, far less than Pepys' original scheme.

The aim of these changes was to formalise volunteers-per-order as the preferred path for the upper middle class and junior sons of nobility to become naval officers. However the rating's limited numbers and reduced practical experience meant many potential applicants continued the more traditional path of enrolling as midshipmen and securing promotion via family connections. A sincere belief in the superiority of practical experience learned on the quarterdeck ensured that the officer class also favoured the traditional model. William IV summed up this view when he remarked that "there was no place superior to the quarterdeck of a British man of war for the education of a gentleman". There was also prejudice against volunteer-per-order graduates. Volunteers-per-order also faced reduced opportunity once they completed their training. The then rating of midshipman-by-order, or midshipman ordinary, was used specifically to distinguish them from midshipmen who had served aboard ship and were paid more.

The rating ceased when the Naval Academy closed as a young officer training establishment in 1837, after which all youngsters setting out on a naval career proceeded directly to sea.

== Famous King's Letter Boys ==
- Admiral Rodney
- Admiral Byng

== Bibliography ==
- Dickinson, H W (2007), Educating the Royal Navy, Routledge, ISBN 978-0-415-37641-9, OCLC 221337177
- Hill, John R. and Bryan Ranft Eds. (2002) The Oxford Illustrated History of the Royal Navy, Oxford University Press
- Lewis, Michael (1939), England's Sea-Officers, London: George Allen & Unwin, OCLC 1084558
- Rodger, N. A. M. (1986). The Wooden World: An Anatomy of the Georgian Navy. Annapolis, Maryland: Naval Institute Press. ISBN 0870219871.
