= Midshipman =

Officer cadet

A midshipman is an officer of the lowest rank in the Royal Navy, United States Navy, and many Commonwealth navies. Commonwealth countries which use the rank include Canada (Naval Cadet), Australia, Bangladesh, Namibia, New Zealand, South Africa, India, Pakistan, Singapore, Sri Lanka, and Kenya.

In the 17th century, a midshipman was a rating for an experienced seaman, and the word derives from the area aboard a ship, amidships, either where he worked on the ship, or where he was berthed. Beginning in the 18th century, a commissioned officer candidate was rated as a midshipman, and the seaman rating began to slowly die out. By the Napoleonic era (1793–1815), a midshipman was an apprentice officer who had at least nominally served at least three years as a volunteer, officer's servant or able seaman, and was roughly equivalent to a present-day petty officer in rank and responsibilities. After serving at least three years as a midshipman or master's mate, he was eligible to take the examination for lieutenant. Promotion to lieutenant was not automatic, and many midshipmen took positions as master's mates for an increase in pay and responsibility aboard ship. Midshipmen in the United States Navy were trained and served similarly to midshipmen in the Royal Navy, although unlike their counterparts in the Royal Navy, a midshipman was a warrant officer rank until 1912.

During the 19th century, changes in the training of naval officers in both the Royal Navy and the United States Navy led to the replacement of apprenticeship aboard ships with formal schooling in a naval college. Midshipman began to mean an officer cadet at a naval college. Trainees now spent around four years in a college and two years at sea prior to promotion to commissioned officer rank. Between the mid-19th and mid-20th centuries, time at sea declined to less than a year as the entry age was increased from 12 to 18.

Ranks equivalent to midshipman exist in many other navies. Using US midshipman or pre-fleet board UK midshipman as the basis for comparison, the equivalent rank would be a naval cadet in training to become a junior commissioned officer. Using post-fleet board UK midshipman for comparison, the rank would be the most junior commissioned officer in the rank structure, and similar to a US ensign in role and responsibility. In many Romance languages, the literal translation of the local term for "midshipman" into English is "Navy Guard", including the French garde marine, Spanish guardia marina, Portuguese guarda-marinha, and Italian guardiamarina. Today, these ranks all refer to naval cadets, but historically they were selected by the monarchy, and were trained mostly on land as soldiers.

== History ==
=== Apprentice officers ===
==== Royal Navy (1662–1836) ====
===== Origins =====
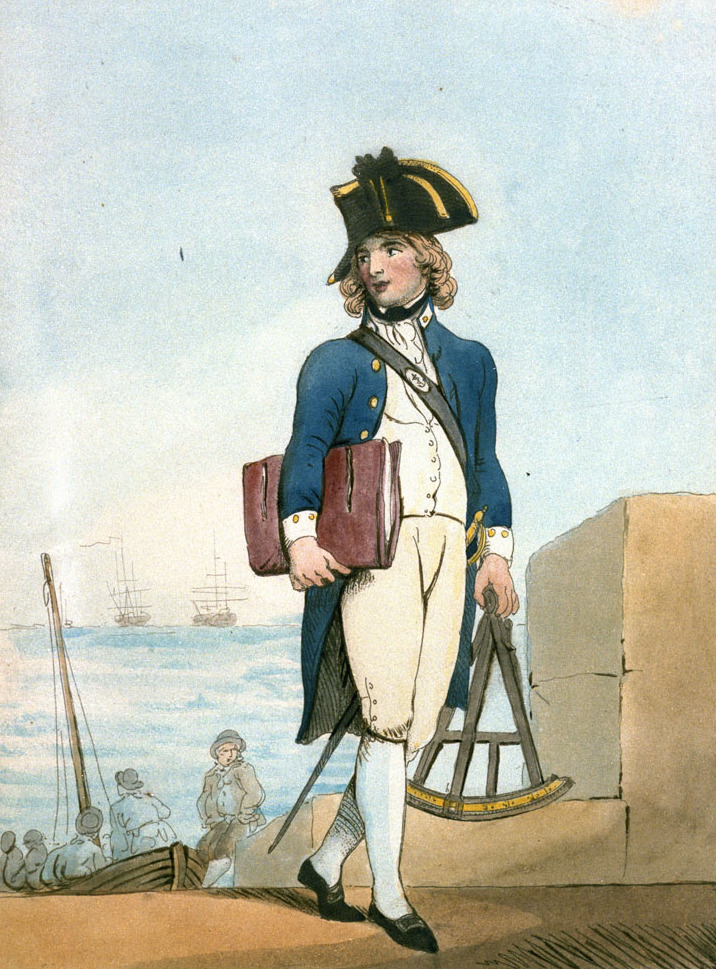
1799 illustration of a Royal Navy midshipman

The rank of midshipman originated during the Tudor and Stuart eras, and originally referred to a post for an experienced seaman promoted from the ordinary deck hands, who worked in between the main and mizzen masts and had more responsibility than an ordinary seaman, but was not a military officer or an officer in training. The first published use of the term midshipman was in 1662. The word derives from an area aboard a ship, amidships, but it refers either to the location where midshipmen worked on the ship, or the location where midshipmen were berthed.

By the 18th century, four types of midshipman existed: midshipman (original rating), midshipman extraordinary, midshipman (apprentice officer), and midshipman ordinary. Some midshipmen were older men, and while most were officer candidates who failed to pass the lieutenant examination or were passed over for promotion, some members of the original rating served, as late as 1822, alongside apprentice officers without themselves aspiring to a commission. By 1794, all midshipmen were considered officer candidates, and the original rating was phased out.

===== Entry =====
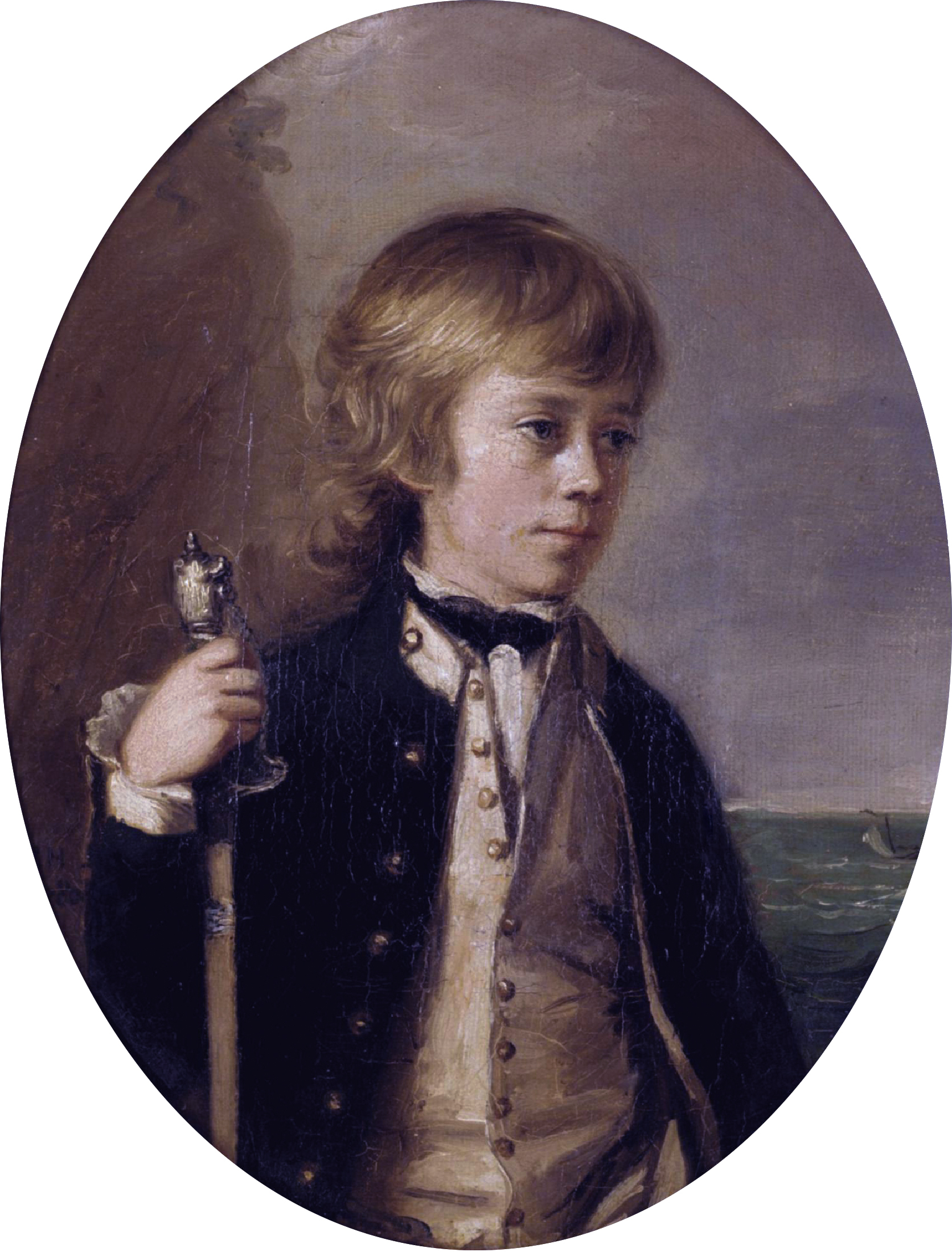
1780 portrait of Henry William Bayntun as a midshipman

Beginning in 1661, boys who aspired to become officers were sent by their families to serve on ships with a "letter of service" from the crown, and were paid at the same rate as midshipmen. The letter instructed the admirals and captains that the bearer was to be shown "such kindness as you shall judge fit for a gentleman, both in accommodating him in your ship and in furthering his improvement". Their official rating was volunteer-per-order, but they were often known as King's letter boys, to distinguish their higher social class from the original midshipman rating.

Beginning in 1677, Royal Navy regulations for promotion to lieutenant required service as a midshipman, and promotion to midshipman required some time at sea. By the Napoleonic era, the regulations required at least three years of services as a midshipman or master's mate and six years of total sea time. Sea time was earned in various ways, most boys served this period at sea in any lower rating, either as a servant of one of the ship's officers, a volunteer, or a seaman.

By the 1730s, the rating volunteer-per-order was phased out and replaced with a system where prospective midshipmen served as servants for officers. For example, a captain was allowed four servants for every 100 men aboard his ship; many of these servants were young men destined to become officers.

In 1729, the Royal Naval Academy in Portsmouth – renamed the Royal Naval College in 1806 – was founded, for 40 students aged between 13 and 16, who would take three years to complete a course of study defined in an illustrated book, and would earn two years of sea time as part of their studies. The rating of midshipman-by-order, or midshipman ordinary, was used specifically for graduates of the Royal Naval College, to distinguish them from midshipmen who had served aboard ship, who were paid more. The school was unpopular in the Navy, because officers enjoyed the privilege of having servants and preferred the traditional method of training officers via apprenticeship.

In 1794, officers' servants were abolished and a new class of volunteers called 'volunteer class I' was created for boys between the ages of 11 and 13 who were considered future midshipmen and lived in the gunroom on a ship-of-the-line or with the midshipmen on a frigate or smaller vessel. Volunteers were paid £6 per year. By 1816, the rating of midshipman ordinary was phased out, and all apprentice officers were rated as midshipmen.

===== Social background and uniform =====
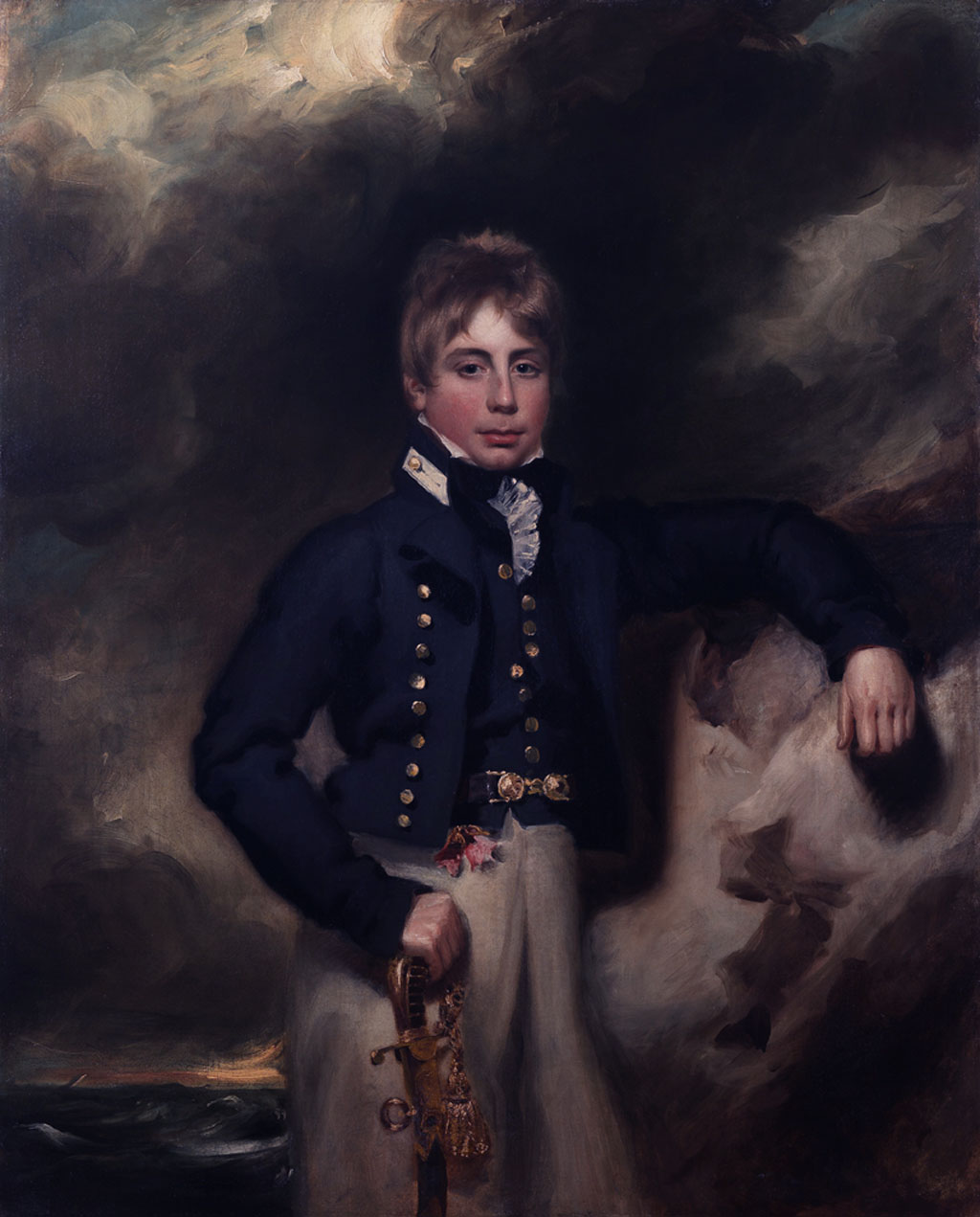
c. 1800 portrait of a Royal Navy midshipman

In the 18th century Royal Navy, rank and position on board ship was defined by a mix of two hierarchies, an official hierarchy of ranks and a conventionally recognized social divide between gentlemen and non-gentlemen. (Note: A midshipman was a petty officer who could be demoted by the captain, but outranked most other petty officers and lesser warrant officers, such as the Master-at-arms.) Boys aspiring for a commission were often called young gentlemen instead of their substantive rating to distinguish their higher social standing from the ordinary sailors. Generally, aboard most warships common seamen berthed in the gundeck, while officers were quartered at the stern. Occasionally, a midshipman would be posted aboard a ship in a lower rating such as able seaman but would eat and sleep with his social equals in the cockpit. (Note: Horatio Nelson served as an able seaman aboard the Seahorse, and Peter Heywood served as an able seaman aboard HMS Bounty.)

Approximately 50% of midshipmen were the sons of professional men, which included the sons of naval officers, and there were notable sailing families throughout the Age of Sail, such as the Saumarez, Hood, and Parker families. The niceties of preferment and promotion made family connections an obvious advantage for prospective officers. Members of the peerage and landed gentry formed the next largest group, about 27% of officers. The numbers were smaller, but similarly, their connections gave them excellent prospects for promotion, and they had a considerable influence on the Royal Navy. A notable member of this group was Prince William, later William IV, who served as a midshipman from 1780 to 1785. The rest were from commercial or working class backgrounds, and because of the advantages possessed by the nobility and professional sailors, their chances of promotion to lieutenant were slim.

Since most midshipmen were from the gentry or had family connections with sailing ships, many used their connections to have their names placed on a ship's books. The practice, known colloquially as "false muster" was common even though it was technically illegal and frowned upon. This allowed some boys to be promoted to midshipmen, or in some cases lieutenant, without having completed the required amount of time at sea. A notable example was Thomas Cochrane, whose uncle had him entered at the age of five; his name was carried on various ships until he was 18 and received his commission.

When uniforms were introduced in the Navy in 1748, midshipmen started wearing the same uniform as commissioned officers. They also began wearing their traditional badge of rank, a white patch of cloth with a gold button and a twist of white cord on each side of the coat collar. The uniform emphasized that midshipmen were gentlemen and officers under instruction.

===== Duties and promotion =====
Midshipmen were expected to work on the ship, but were also expected to learn navigation and seamanship. They were expected to have learned already, as able seamen and volunteers, to rig sails, other duties included keeping watch, relaying messages between decks, supervising gun batteries, commanding small boats, and taking command of a sub-division of the ship's company under the supervision of one of the lieutenants. On smaller ships, midshipmen were instructed by a senior master's mate, often a passed midshipman, who taught them mathematics, navigation, and sailing lore. Larger ships would carry a schoolmaster, who was rated as a midshipman but usually was a civilian like the chaplain. Midshipmen were expected to keep detailed navigational logs, which were shown to the captain to assess their progress.

Route to a commission in the Royal Navy, c. 1810

Prior to promotion to lieutenant, a commissioned officer candidate in the Royal Navy had to pass a formal examination. Officially, a prospective lieutenant was at least 19, and was expected to produce proof of his service, which would include certificates from his commanders and journals kept while a midshipman. However, most midshipmen aspired to take the lieutenant examination at age 17 or 18, and the typical age of a midshipman was between 15 and 22. The candidate was summoned before a board of three captains and questioned about seamanship, navigation, and discipline. The board would ask questions such as:

An enemy is observed; give orders for clearing your ship, and make all the necessary preparations for engaging.

Like the board, which might be an ad hoc affair, the actual exam questions were not standardized and their content depended mostly on individual captains. In seamanship, the candidate was expected to be able to splice ropes, reef a sail, work a ship in sailing and shift his tides. In navigation, he was expected to be able to keep a reckoning of the ship's way by plane sailing, to use Mercator projection maps and observation of the sun and stars to determine the course and position of the ship, and to understand the variation of the compass. He was also expected to be qualified to do the duty of an able seaman and midshipman.

Failure usually meant six more months of sea service before the examination could again be attempted. Some men never passed it. Successful completion made the midshipman a 'passed midshipman'. From the 18th century until the second half of the 19th century, a midshipman in the Royal Navy who passed the lieutenant's examination did not automatically receive a commission. Midshipmen with political connections were promoted first, while others would wait their turn on a roster. During wartime, when large numbers of ships and men might be lost in battle, most passed midshipman would be promoted in a year or two, but during peacetime the wait might be so long that the midshipman would eventually be considered too old and lose his chance for a commission.

Passed midshipmen awaiting promotion often elected to become master's mates, a high-ranking petty officer who assisted the master with his duties, served on watch as deputy to the lieutenants, and commanded small boats. A midshipman who became master's mate earned an increase in pay from £2 5s to £3 16s per month but initially reduced his chances at a commission because master's mates, along with masters, were assumed to have a working-class background. Over time, however, appointment to master's mate became considered a normal part of the path to a commission; the situation caused some confusion during the last part of the 18th century, when two parallel roles – master's mates trying to become masters, and former midshipmen working toward a commission – held the same title and responsibilities aboard ship.

By the first years of the 19th century, the term 'mate', without the prefix master's, was used for passed midshipmen, to distinguish them from master's mates who had not served as midshipmen. In 1824, the rating of master's assistant replaced master's mate, and mate continued to be used unofficially by passed midshipmen. These changes helped eliminate the confusion caused by the mingling of midshipmen in the navigator's branch. In 1838 a Royal Commission, presided over by the Duke of Wellington, recommended the institution of the rank of mate as an official step between midshipman and lieutenant. In 1861 mate was abolished in favour of sub-lieutenant.

==== Royal Navy from 1836 ====
The original Royal Naval College closed in 1837, after which the only method for training midshipmen in the Royal Navy was aboard ships. In 1844 the rank of naval cadet was created, and to qualify as a midshipman a candidate had to be 14 years old, successfully pass an admiralty examination and have two years of service as a naval cadet or three years of service in the Navy. A decline in qualified officers prompted the Navy to order training in a ship at anchor for all cadets, which began in 1857 aboard HMS Illustrious, which was replaced by HMS Britannia in 1859. Britannia was moved to Portland in 1862, and to the present location of the Britannia Royal Naval College, Dartmouth in 1863.

Beginning in the 1840s the normal entry age for executive officer cadets, those destined to command ships and fleets, was between 12 and 13, and instruction consisted of two years of classroom training, during which time trainees were rated as naval cadets. Cadets who received a first-class passing grade in studies, seamanship and conduct on their final examination could receive a credit for up to a year of sea time, and could be rated as midshipmen immediately after passing out of the college. After passing out of the college, cadets served aboard a special training vessel for one year. Cadets were then rated as midshipmen, and served aboard the fleet another two years. Midshipmen lived in the gunroom, kept watches, and ran the ship's boats. They received instruction in navigation every day. After five total years of training and having reached the age of 19, the midshipmen were eligible to take the examination for lieutenant. After passing the examination for lieutenant, midshipmen were commissioned as sub-lieutenants, and were transferred to the Royal Naval College, Greenwich, which opened in 1873 as the 'University of the Navy'.

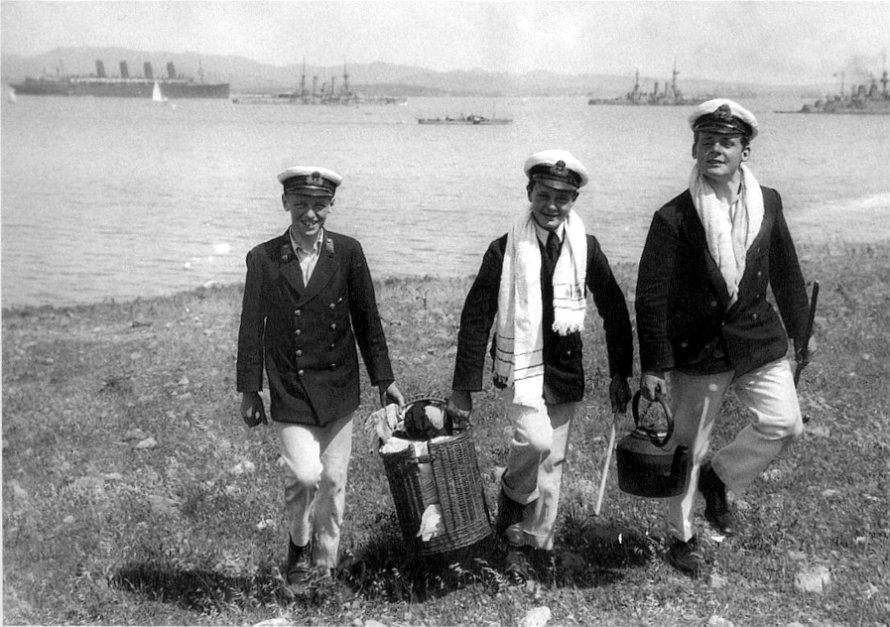
Midshipmen George Drewry, Wilfred Malleson, and Greg Russell in April 1915.

Beginning in 1903, officer training of military and engineering students was reformed by the Selborne-Fisher scheme, and engineering and executive officer candidates began to enter the Navy in the same way, which was termed 'Common Entry'. (Note: The scheme included the Royal Marines but they did not participate in the scheme.) Previously engineer cadets had been trained separately at the Royal Naval Engineering College, Keyham, which was closed in 1910. In 1903 a new preparatory college was opened at the Royal Naval College, Osborne, in part of Queen Victoria's favourite residence but not a favourite of her successor Edward VII who had presented it to the nation in 1902. Training initially consisted of two years at Osborne and two years at Dartmouth as cadets, later four years at Dartmouth, followed by approximately 3 years of sea duty as midshipmen prior to promotion to sub-lieutenant. In 1905 a new building was completed on shore to replace Britannia, which was named Britannia Royal Naval College. In 1913, increasing demand for officers led to recruitment of 18-year-old graduates of public schools, which was called 'Special Entry', and was conducted separately from Selborne scheme cadets. Special entry cadets trained for approximately 6 months prior to service in the fleet as midshipmen. When World War I began in 1914, all the cadets at Dartmouth were quickly mobilized as midshipmen in the Reserve Fleet. During the war, two midshipmen, George Drewry and Wilfred Malleson were awarded the Victoria Cross, the highest award of the British Commonwealth for gallantry, during the Landing at Cape Helles. After World War I ended, opposition to the Selborne-Fisher scheme led to re-segregating executive and engineering officers into separate branches, while common entry and special entry were maintained.

After World War II another series of reforms, influenced by the quality of officers produced by the special entry scheme and other nations' experience with training officer candidates in a university setting, were initiated to increase the quality of officers in the Navy. In 1949 the entry age was increased to 16, and by 1955 the entry age was increased to 18 and entry required a minimum of two A levels. After 1957, midshipmen no longer served in the fleet. In 1972, all cadets became midshipmen when the rank of cadet was abolished.

==== Commonwealth navies ====
As Dominions of the British Empire formed their own navies during the 20th century, further countries began using the rank of midshipman. Today Australia, New Zealand, South Africa, Pakistan, India, Singapore, Sri Lanka, Bangladesh, Kenya, and Brunei use the rank. Prior to 1968 Canada also used the rank of midshipman, until the National Defence Act consolidated the Royal Canadian Navy with the Army and Air Force into a single military, called the Canadian Forces. As part of the act, the rank of midshipman was replaced with the rank of naval cadet.

==== United States Navy (1794–1845) ====
When Congress created the United States Navy in 1794, midshipman was listed as a rank of warrant officer in the Naval Act of 1794, and they were appointed by the President of the United States. Midshipmen had similar duties and responsibilities as in the Royal Navy, and were typically young men between the age of 14 and 22 in training to become a naval officer. "Passed midshipman" was first used in 1819, and was an official rank of the US Navy.

During the long period of peace between 1815 and 1846 midshipmen had few opportunities for promotion, and their warrants were often obtained via patronage. The poor quality of officer training in the US Navy became visible after the Somers Affair, an alleged mutiny aboard the training ship USS Somers in 1842, and the subsequent execution of midshipman Philip Spencer. Spencer had gained his post aboard the Somers via the influence of his father, United States Secretary of War John C. Spencer.

==== United States Navy from 1845 ====
Congress formally authorized the establishment of the United States Military Academy in 1802, but it took almost 50 years to approve a similar school for naval officers. One major reason for the delay was that Navy leaders preferred the apprenticeship system, citing famous officers such as Nelson and the captains of the War of 1812 who did not attend a formal naval school. However, after the Somers Affair, officers realized that the system for training officers had to change to be more efficient.

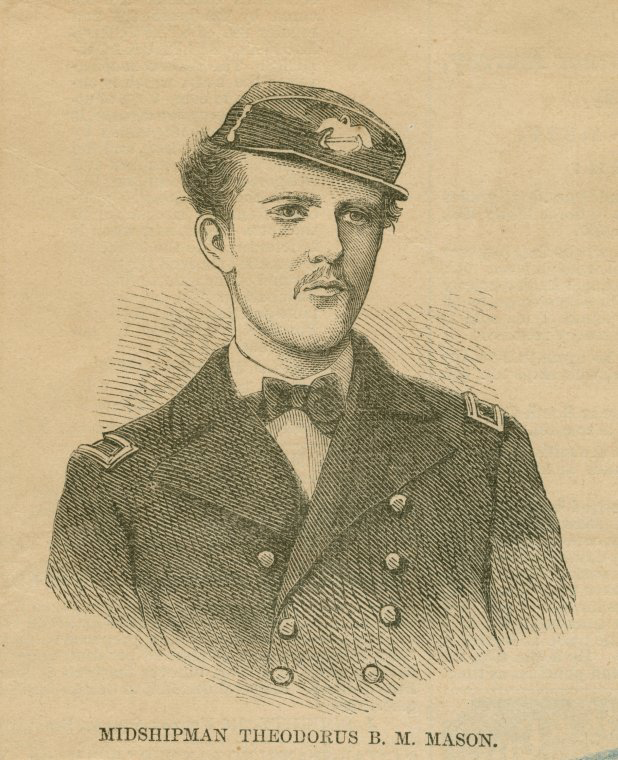
Midshipman Theodorus B. M. Mason of the United States Navy (c. 1868)

George Bancroft, appointed Secretary of the Navy in 1845, decided to work outside of congressional approval and create a new academy for officers. He formed a council led by Commodore Perry to create a new system for training officers, and turned the old Fort Severn at Annapolis into a new institution which would be designated as the United States Naval Academy in 1851. Midshipmen studied at the academy for four years and trained aboard ships each summer. Midshipman began to mean "passed midshipman" at this time, and a student at the Naval Academy was a cadet midshipman. The rank of ensign was created in 1862, and passed midshipmen were promoted to ensign when vacancies occurred.

In 1865, the Department of Steam Enginery was created and cadet engineers were admitted to the academy for the first time. In 1874, Congress changed the curriculum to include four years of classroom training and two years of sea duty aboard a regular vessel prior to examinations as warranted midshipmen. In 1882, Congress eliminated the distinction in training between engineer and naval cadets, and designated the student officers as naval cadets; the name reverted to midshipmen in 1902. By an act of Congress passed in 1903, two appointments as midshipmen were allowed for each senator, representative, and delegate in Congress, two for the District of Columbia, and five each year at large. In 1912, Congress authorized commissioning midshipmen as ensigns on graduation day, and ended the previously required two years of post-graduation sea service as warrant officers.

In 1930, the Naval Academy received accreditation as an approved technological institution. In 1933, a new law enabled the Naval, Military, and Coast Guard Academies to award bachelor of science degrees, and the class of 1933 was the first to receive this degree and have it written in the diploma. In 1937, the superintendent of the Naval Academy was granted the authority to award Bachelor of Science degrees to all living graduates.

=== Cadet officer ===
This rank is used in Merchant Marine/Merchant Navy service for those training to be deck or engineering officers. There are typically two types of cadet officer.

1. Deck Cadet
2. Engineer Cadet or (U.K.) Marine Engineer Cadet
3. In the U.K. there are also Marine Electro-Technical Cadets

Cadets may be in a commercial training program, or may be students at state, regional, or National maritime colleges or academies.

=== Snotty ===
In Royal Navy slang, a midshipman is sometimes referred to as a "snotty". Two popular stories give origins for the term: the first claims that it arose from a shortage of handkerchiefs among midshipmen, who would consequently use their sleeves to wipe their noses. Prince William, later William IV, is sometimes cited as a notorious example of this practice among midshipmen. The other story claims that the three buttons formerly sewn onto midshipmen's jacket cuffs were placed there to prevent them from wiping their noses on their sleeves.

== Modern usage ==
=== Royal Navy ===
Midshipman
- Shoulder board and lapel insignia
- Country: United Kingdom
- Service branch: Royal Navy
- Abbreviation: Mid
- Rank group: Junior officers
- NATO rank code: OF-1
- Next higher rank: Sub-lieutenant
- Equivalent ranks: Second lieutenant (RM/British Army); Pilot officer (RAF)

In the modern Royal Navy, a midshipman is the lowest rank of officer, and ranks with second lieutenant in the British Army and pilot officer in the Royal Air Force and above all enlisted and warrant ranks. (Note: Pre-1956 Royal Navy and Royal Marines warrant officers and commissioned officers from Warrant Rank were senior to midshipmen.) A midshipman's rank insignia, which has changed little since Napoleonic times, is called a "turnback": a white patch of cloth with a gold button and a twist of white cord on each side of the coat collar.

Prospective officers must have at least five GCSEs, including English and maths, plus at least 72 (new tariff) UCAS points from at least two A levels or other suitable qualifications (each qualification must be over 45 (old tariff) UCAS points). They must pass a two-and-a-half-day assessment, called the Admiralty Interview Board, and a medical examination.

Initial officer training for the Royal Navy takes place at Britannia Royal Naval College. The first two phases are 15 weeks each, followed by specialisation training. All prospective officers join as midshipman, but use the rank of officer cadet when under initial training.

During the first seven weeks of training, officer cadets learn militarisation and sea sense, focusing on learning about the military environment, along with team and leadership skills. During the second seven weeks, officer cadets learn essential sea officer skills, including navigation and the marine environment, strategic studies, and basic sea survival. During the second term officer cadets spend 6 weeks in Initial Sea Time (IST), serving aboard capital warships as junior ratings. Upon completion of Initial Sea Time, officer cadets return to Dartmouth for four weeks to complete their final leadership assessment, the Maritime Leadership Exercise (MARL). MARL may be completed prior to IST depending on scheduling. If they have been successful, officers of all branches then pass out of the college.

Upon completion of initial officer training, university cadet entrants, engineering, logistics and flight specialisation officer cadets move to their second phase of training elsewhere within the Royal Navy. Midshipmen specialising in warfare remain at the college for the Initial Warfare Officer's Foundation course, which completes part of a foundation degree in naval studies (equating to two thirds of a bachelor's degree), on completion of initial professional training. Officers can complete degrees via distance learning with the Open University, although completion is not required.

==== Royal Australian Navy ====
A midshipman in the Royal Australian Navy (RAN) holds a commission, which is effective from the date of their appointment. Officer candidates enter the RAN at various ranks depending on previous experience or degree qualifications; graduates from a three-year course, non-degree qualified entrants, and sailor changeovers below the rank of leading seaman enter as midshipman. (Note: On entry to the Navy, candidates with 3–4 year degrees enter as acting sub-lieutenants or sub-lieutenants. Medical personnel enter as lieutenants, and chaplains enter as commanders.)

On joining the RAN, midshipmen complete six months' initial officer training (New Entry Officers' Course) at the Royal Australian Naval College. Following this, all members serve six months in the fleet completing Primary Qualification (PQ) continuation training. Direct entry midshipmen continue their normal training and Australian Defence Force Academy (ADFA) entry midshipmen post to Canberra to study at the ADFA in their second year in the Navy. Midshipmen undertake an undergraduate degree over the course of three years, whilst also completing elements of their naval training. ADFA midshipmen are also undergraduate students of the University of New South Wales (UNSW). When they graduate from UNSW at ADFA at the completion of their three- or four-year undergraduate program, they do so with a fully recognized degree from UNSW – the same degree received by graduates of UNSW's campus in Sydney. During Single Service Training (SST) at ADFA, midshipmen have the opportunity to return to sea during the SST period as well as visiting shore establishments for PQ related training.

==== Royal New Zealand Navy ====
In the Royal New Zealand Navy (RNZN), midshipman is the lowest officer rank for officers under training and retained upon completion of initial training by those without a university degree. Unlike officer cadet ranks in the Army, midshipmen are treated as officers but do not hold a commission. The RNZN has approximately 60 midshipmen in service at a time.

Midshipman begin their career at Junior Officer Common Training, which lasts 21 weeks. After completing their initial training course, midshipmen serve aboard ships for a short time, followed by specialty training for 16 weeks. After approximately two years in the Navy, midshipmen are promoted to ensign. Officers who entered the service with a university degree are promoted to sub-lieutenant after completion of Junior Officer Common Training. Officers without a degree have the option of earning a university degree while serving in the Navy.

==== South African Navy ====
A midshipman in the South African Navy (SAN) is an officer of the lowest rank. Officer candidates are citizens between the ages of 18 and 22, either in grade 12 or graduated from high school with an academic background in mathematics and science. Cadets initially spend a year training at the South African Naval College in Gordon's Bay, about 55 km southeast of Cape Town, and upon graduation are commissioned as midshipmen. Midshipmen can then study for three more years at the South African Military Academy, and upon graduation receive a B Mil degree from Stellenbosch University.

==== Indian Navy ====
Midshipmen in the Indian Navy begin their career as cadets at the National Defence Academy or the Indian Naval Academy, where they study for approximately three years. After graduation they receive a BTech degree from Jawaharlal Nehru University and are assigned to training ships for one year. After six months aboard the training ship, the cadets are promoted to midshipman. At the end of their training midshipmen are examined by a board and are cleared for promotion to sub-lieutenant.

==== Pakistan Navy ====
Cadets in the Pakistan Navy undertake an initial 18 months' training at the Pakistan Naval Academy. They study humanities, engineering, professional and technical subjects. After passing out they are appointed midshipmen, and undertake another six months of training at sea. They are assigned to operations, weapons engineering, mechanical engineering, or logistics. After passing the final fleet examination, they are promoted to the rank of sub-lieutenant.

Midshipman insignia of Commonwealth nations
RAN midshipman insignia and patch

RNZN midshipman patch

SAN midshipman insignia

Pakistan Navy midshipman insignia

=== United States Naval and Merchant Marine Academies ===
U.S. Navy midshipman rank structure (USNA & NROTC)

In the modern United States Navy, a midshipman is classified as an officer of the line, though their exercise of authority is limited by their training status. Legally, midshipmen are a special grade of uncommissioned officer that ranks between the senior noncommissioned enlisted grade (E-9) and the lowest grade of chief warrant officer (W-2, in the U.S. Coast Guard, which does not currently use the grade of warrant officer (W-1)) (Note: The Navy and Coast Guard abolished the grade of warrant officer (W-1) in 1975, but the US Navy again began using W-1 in 2019.) or warrant officer (W-1), U.S. Army, U.S. Navy, or U.S. Marine Corps. (Note: The U.S. Army and U.S. Marine Corps continue to appoint officers to the grade of warrant officer (W-1), as warrant officers they outrank midshipmen (as well as cadets), who are in training to become officers and have yet neither a commission nor warrant of authority. The U.S. Air Force no longer uses the warrant officer ranks, the U.S. Public Health Service and U.S. Maritime Service, while authorized warrant officers, have never appointed or commissioned warrant officers, and the National Oceanic and Atmospheric Administration is not authorized warrant officers.)

Students at the United States Naval Academy (USNA) are appointed to Office as midshipmen, United States Navy, by the President, alone, without Senate confirmation. Students at the United States Merchant Marine Academy (USMMA) are appointed to Office as midshipmen, United States Navy Reserve, by the Secretary of the Navy, using delegated Presidential authority, and are likewise not subject to Senate confirmation. Students in the Naval Reserve Officer Training Corps (NROTC) are also appointed to Office as midshipmen, United States Navy Reserve, by the Secretary of the Navy, without Senate confirmation. (Note: Legally, NROTC midshipmen enlist in the Navy Reserve or Marine Corps Reserve for the purpose of being appointed as a midshipman; USNA midshipmen are neither enlisted nor commissioned or warrant officers.) The student body at the USNA is the Brigade of Midshipmen, and the student body at the USMMA is the Regiment of Midshipmen.

Generally, a nomination from a member of Congress or the Vice President is required to receive an appointment to the USNA. A nomination does not guarantee an appointment; in a typical year about 38% of nominees receive an appointment. Currently each member of Congress and the Vice President can have five appointees attending the Naval Academy at any time. Other nomination sources include the Secretary of the Navy, who may appoint 170 enlisted members of the regular and reserve Navy and Marine Corps to the Naval Academy each year, and the President may nominate an unlimited number of children of career military personnel for up to 100 appointments each year. Additionally, children of Medal of Honor recipients and select cadets of JROTC Honor Unit with Distinction units do not need a nomination but need only qualify for admission. The United States Merchant Marine Academy only accepts nominations from members of Congress. There are currently no Presidential, Vice-Presidential, military-affiliated, JROTC-honor unit, ROTC or Unit Commander, or Medal of Honor nominations permitted to the USMMA.

Midshipmen at the US Naval Academy, US Merchant Marine Academy, and in the NROTC wear uniforms that comply with standards established for commissioned officers of the Navy, with shoulder board and sleeve insignia varying by school year or midshipman officer rank as prescribed by Chapter 6 of Navy Uniform Regulations. Midshipmen wear gold fouled anchors as the primary insignia on caps and shoulder boards and gold plain anchors as collar insignia on service dress and full dress uniforms. Marine-option midshipmen in the NROTC wear gold Eagle, Globe and Anchor insignia in place of the fouled anchor insignia worn by all other midshipmen.

Midshipmen at the US Naval Academy study a core curriculum of engineering, natural sciences, the humanities, and social sciences, and participate in two required "summer cruise" with an active vessel, after their freshman (plebe) and junior academic years. Upon graduation, midshipmen are commissioned as ensigns in the Navy or second lieutenants in the Marine Corps.

Midshipmen at the United States Merchant Marine Academy study a similar core curriculum, except they are split into deck (navigation oriented) and engineering programs. Additionally, they typically spend a year at sea working as cadets on U.S. flagged merchant ships, visiting ports around the world. At graduation they have two options: (1) a job in the maritime industry ashore or sailing aboard commercial US-flagged vessels, plus a US Navy Reserve commission, (Note: Graduates of the USMMA may also request a commission in any of the reserve components, such as the U.S. Coast Guard Reserve, although the request is subject to approval by both the U.S. Navy and the gaining Service.) or (2) an active-duty commission in any of the United States Uniformed Services (Army, Marine Corps, Navy, Air Force, Coast Guard, National Oceanographic and Atmospheric Administration, or United States Public Health Service) as an ensign or second lieutenant.

=== Mexican Navy ===
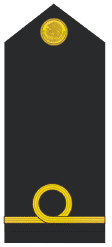
Mexican Midshipman Epaulettes. Notice the Elliot's eye that differentiates it to the rank of Primer Maestre, given only to the Heroica Escuela Naval Militar graduates

The Mexican Navy, unlike other countries that use this rank as a cadet's grade in their naval academies, give this rank to the Heroica Escuela Naval Militar's graduates, serving an entire year aboard different units (depending on the officer's career, currently Surface Warfare, Marine Corps, and Naval Aviation). During this year of internship, Midshipmen have to perform different Professional Practices to put in practice all the knowledge acquired from the Naval Academy, writing a Thesis Report of all the activities they performed. After completing their Professional Practices, Midshipmen have to take a Professional Exam in the Heroica Escuela Naval Militar where, if they approve it, get promoted to the rank of Teniente de Corbeta.

== Other countries ==
Today, ranks equivalent to midshipman exist in many countries. Using U.S. midshipman or pre-fleet board UK midshipman as the basis for comparison, the equivalent rank would be a naval cadet in training to become a junior commissioned officer. Using post-fleet board UK midshipman for comparison, the rank would be the most junior commissioned officer in the rank structure, and similar to a U.S. ensign in role and responsibility.

The Royal Netherlands Navy has included a midshipman rank since the 17th century. The Dutch term adelborst translates to "noble youth" and stems from the time that naval officers were recruited from the nobility. Today, adelborsten train at the Royal Netherlands Naval College (Dutch: Koninklijk Instituut voor de Marine) for 3 years.

Officer cadets in the German Navy begin their training at the Naval Academy Mürwik (German: Marineschule Mürwik) in Flensburg-Mürwik holding enlisted ranks with the qualifier officer candidate (German: Offizieranwärter), abbreviated as OA. After about a year, they are promoted to Seekadetten, equivalent to the non-commissioned officer (NCO) rank Mate (German: Maat), and move to the University of the German Federal Armed Forces. About nine months later, they are promoted to Fähnrich zur See rank, equivalent to the NCO rank Boatswain (German: Bootsmann). After 30 months of total training they are promoted to the final officer candidate rank, Oberfähnrich zur See, equivalent to the NCO rank Hauptbootsmann, and after about 4 years of total training graduate with a master's degree.

The Spanish Navy uses the rank of Guardiamarina in 1717, established with the formation at Cadiz of the Royal Company of Midshipmen (Spanish: Real Compañía de Guardias Marinas). Titles derived from the Spanish name are used in Latin American navies. This originated in the succession of the Bourbon Philip V of Spain to the Spanish throne, when the French system of naval officer education spread to Spain. The French rank of garde de la marine was established in 1670, when an office of the monarchy selected young gentlemen from the nobility to serve the King in the Gardes de la Marine. The concept of the Gardes was borrowed from the various guards units within the Maison militaire du roi de France. In 1686 these guards were organized into companies of cadets at the ports of Brest, Rochefort and Toulon. Unlike midshipmen in the Royal Navy, the Gardes trained mostly on shore and focused on military drill and theory rather than practical skills in gunnery, navigation and seamanship. By restricting the French officer corps to members of the nobility, there were not enough Gardes to man all of the ships during wartime. To fill the gaps, volunteers were temporarily recruited from the merchant service; they were allowed to hold permanent rank in the navy starting in 1763. These professional officers wore blue uniforms to distinguish them from the Gardes de la Marine who wore red uniforms. After the revolution, the royal connotations of the term garde marine led to its replacement with aspirant (officer cadet), and later élèves de la Marine (naval officer candidate).

The French Navy has adopted new names for officer cadets at the École navale begin their first year as élève-officier, are promoted in their second year to aspirant, and in their third year are commissioned as an acting sub-lieutenant (French: Enseigne de vaisseau de deuxième classe).

In many romance languages, the literal translation of the local term for "midshipman" into English is "Navy Guard", including the French garde-marine, Spanish guardia marina, Portuguese guarda-marinha, and Italian guardiamarina, and in most cases the term refers to the lowest ranking commissioned naval officer. While in modern French-English dictionaries, élève officier translates to midshipman, both the historical term garde-marine and the modern term for an officer candidate, aspirant, are other equivalents to midshipman. (Note: Aspirant: Élève de deuxième année de l'École navale translates to second year student at the Naval Academy.)

=== Comparative ranks and insignia ===
Country, equivalent rank	Insignia	Country, equivalent rank	Insignia
Canada; Naval Cadet · Aspirant de marine	Naval Cadet	France; Aspirant	Aspirant
Germany: Seekadett; Fähnrich zur See; Oberfähnrich zur See	Seekadett Fähnrich zur See Oberfähnrich zur See	Italy; Aspirante guardiamarina	Aspirante guardiamarina
Portugal: Guarda-marinha; Aspirante	Guarda-marinha Aspirante (student from the Escola Naval) Aspirante (not student from the Escola Naval)	Netherlands: Adelborst; Korporaal adelborst; Sergeant adelborst	Adelborst Korporaal adelborst Sergeant adelborst
Spain; Guardiamarina · Aspirante	Guardiamarina (left, 4th year) and Aspirante (right, 2nd year)	Norway; Kvartermester (Note: Officer candidates in the Norwegian Navy hold the rank of Kvartermester.)	Kvartermester sleeve insignia

== Bibliography ==
- Blake, Nicholas; Lawrence, Richard (2005), The Illustrated Companion to Nelson's Navy, Stackpole Books, ISBN 0-8117-3275-4, OCLC 70659490
- Cheema, Pervaiz Iqbal (2003), The Armed Forces of Pakistan, New York University Press, ISBN 0-8147-1633-4, OCLC 49959459
- Chisholm, Hugh, ed. (1911). "Midshipman" . Encyclopædia Britannica. Vol. 18 (11th ed.). Cambridge University Press. pp. 423–424.
- Davies, E. L.; Grove, E. J. (1980), The Royal Naval College Dartmouth: Seventy-five years in Pictures, Portsmouth: Gieves & Hawkes Limited, ISBN 0-85997-462-6
- Davies, J.D. (1991), Gentlemen and Tarpaulins : The Officers and Men of the Restoration Navy, Oxford: Clarendon Press, ISBN 0-19-820263-6
- Hamersly, Lewis (1881), A Naval Encyclopædia, Philadelphia: L. R. Hamersly & Co., OCLC 8514211
- Harding, Richard (1999), Seapower and naval warfare, 1650–1830, Annapolis, MD: Naval Institute Press, ISBN 1-55750-888-7, OCLC 41106614
- King, Dean (2001), A Sea of Words: Lexicon and Companion for Patrick O'Brian's Seafaring Tales, Henry Holt, ISBN 0-8050-6615-2, OCLC 59538604
- Lavery, Brian (1989), Nelson's Navy: The Ships, Men and Organization, Annapolis, MD: Naval Institute Press, ISBN 0-87021-258-3, OCLC 20997619
- Lewis, Michael (1939), England's Sea-Officers, London: George Allen & Unwin, OCLC 1084558
- Lewis, Michael (1960), A Social History of the Navy, London: Ruskin House, OCLC 2832855
- Miller, Nathan (1997), The U.S. Navy: a history (3rd ed.), Annapolis, MD: Naval Institute Press, ISBN 1-55750-595-0, OCLC 37211290
- Morris, James; Kearns, Patricia (1998), Historical Dictionary of the United States Navy, Lanham, MD: Scarecrow Press, ISBN 0-8108-3406-5, OCLC 37903579
- Pack, S.W.C. (1966), Britannia at Dartmouth, London: Redman, OCLC 957379
- Penn, Geoffrey (1957), Snotty: The Story of the Midshipman, London: Hollis & Carter, OCLC 8317840
- Phillipson, David (1996), Band of Brothers: Boy Seamen in the Royal Navy 1800–1956, Stroud: Sutton, ISBN 0-7509-1976-0, OCLC 41959874
- Walker, C.F. (1938), Young Gentlemen: The Story of Midshipmen from the XVIIth Century to the Present Day, London: Longmans, Green, OCLC 2936648
- Winton, John (1995), "Life And Education in a Technically Evolving Navy: 1815–1925", in J.R. Hill (ed.), Oxford Illustrated History of the Royal Navy, Oxford: Oxford University Press, ISBN 0-19-211675-4, OCLC 32237618
