= Royal Mathematical School =

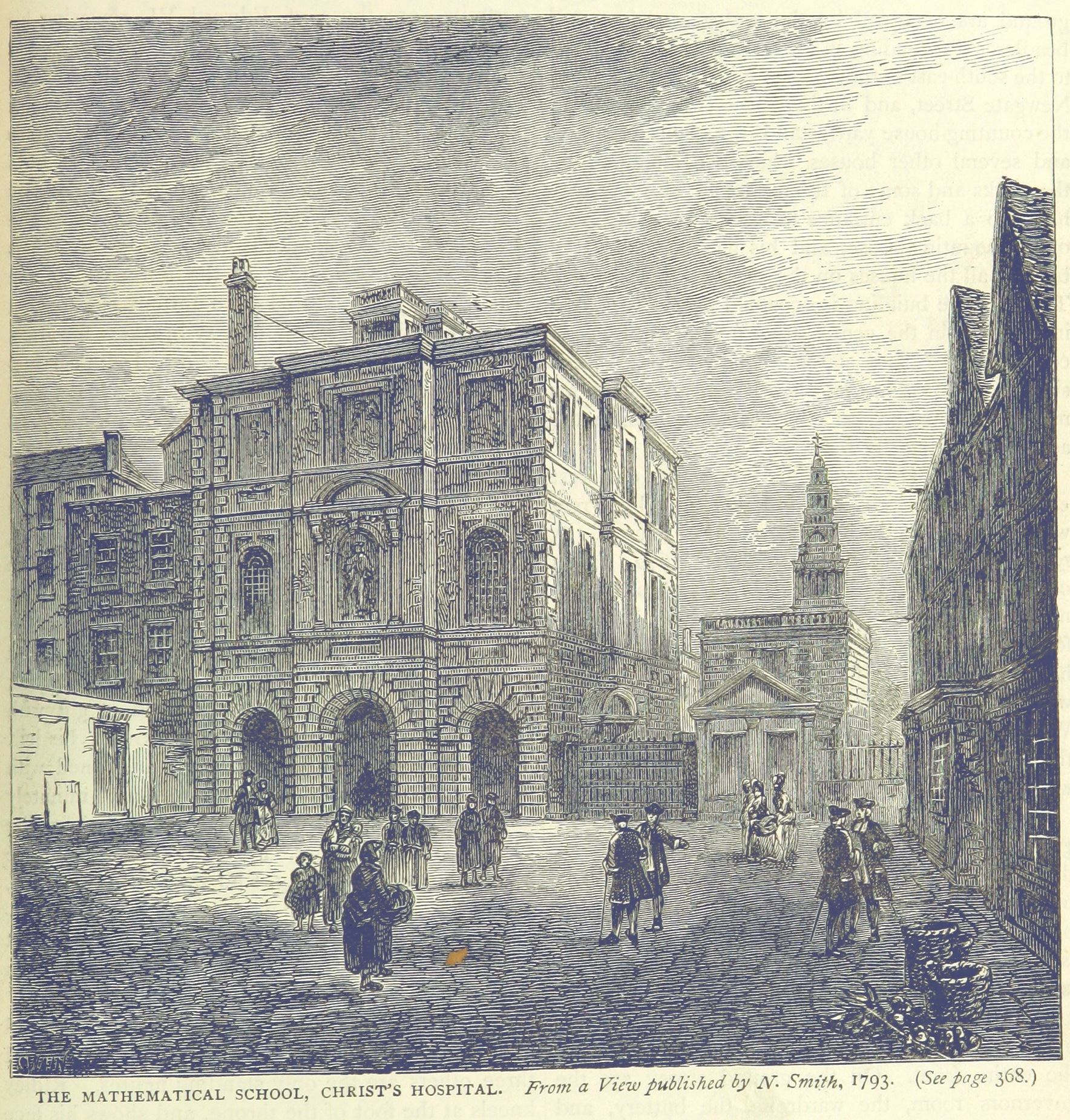
- Christ's Hospital, West Sussex; England

Information
- Established: approx 1680
- Founder: King Charles II of England
- Local authority: Christ's Hospital
- Specialist: Mathematics
- Master: Michaela Weiserova
- Gender: Coeducational
- Age: 11 to 18
- Former Pupils: Old Blues
- Website: https://www.christs-hospital.org.uk/about-ch/the-royal-mathematical-school/

Royal Mathematical School is a branch of Christ's Hospital, founded by Charles II. It is currently Christ's Hospital's Maths Department.

== History ==
It was established so that potential sailors could learn navigation and mathematicians could train at the school. Samuel Pepys was closely involved in the foundation, in 1673, with Jonas Moore. The School was integrated into Christ's Hospital, with boys who were pupils being selected aged 11 or 12 and prepared for a career in the Royal Navy. There was a short-lived new mathematical school within Christ's Hospital, backed by Isaac Newton, and taught by Humphry Ditton; it ran from 1706 to 1715, when Ditton died, but then was closed down. James Hodgson was master of the Royal Mathematical School from 1709 to 1755, with John Robertson as assistant towards the end of his life. Other masters included James Dodson and William Wales. The master of the early 1760s, Daniel Harris, wrote with John Bevis the manual "Hints for Running the Lines" used by Charles Mason and Jeremiah Dixon for their survey of the Mason–Dixon line.

== See also ==
- Christ's Hospital
- Samuel Pepys
- The Salters School of Chemistry
