= Young gentlemen =

Archaic term for a future officer of the Royal Navy

Young gentlemen is an archaic term that was used in the Royal Navy to refer to boys aspiring to become commissioned officers, but who had not necessarily reached the rank of midshipmen. Until promotion to lieutenant, these boys would serve in various ratings, and the term was used to group all these boys together. A similar term today would be officer candidates or cadets.

== History ==
In the 18th-century Royal Navy, rank and position on board ship was defined by a mix of two hierarchies, an official hierarchy of ranks and a conventionally recognized social divide between gentlemen and non-gentlemen. Boys aspiring to a commission were often called 'young gentlemen' instead of their substantive rating to distinguish their higher social standing from the ordinary sailors. Boys would join the navy around the age of 12 and they would serve as a servant for one of the officers, as a volunteer, or as a seaman. After about three years, they would be promoted to midshipman.

'Young gentlemen' was also used as a synonym for midshipmen. Occasionally, a midshipman would be posted aboard a ship in a lower rating such as able seaman but would eat and sleep with his social equals in the cockpit. Horatio Nelson served as an able seaman aboard HMS Seahorse. HMS Bounty was limited to two midshipman posts, but it carried several boys who would have been rated as midshipmen aboard other ships, including Peter Heywood, and George Stewart, who was mustered as an able seaman but served as acting master's mate after Fletcher Christian was promoted to acting lieutenant.
