= James Hodgson (mathematician) =

James Hodgson (1672–1755) was an English astronomer, mathematical teacher, lecturer and writer.

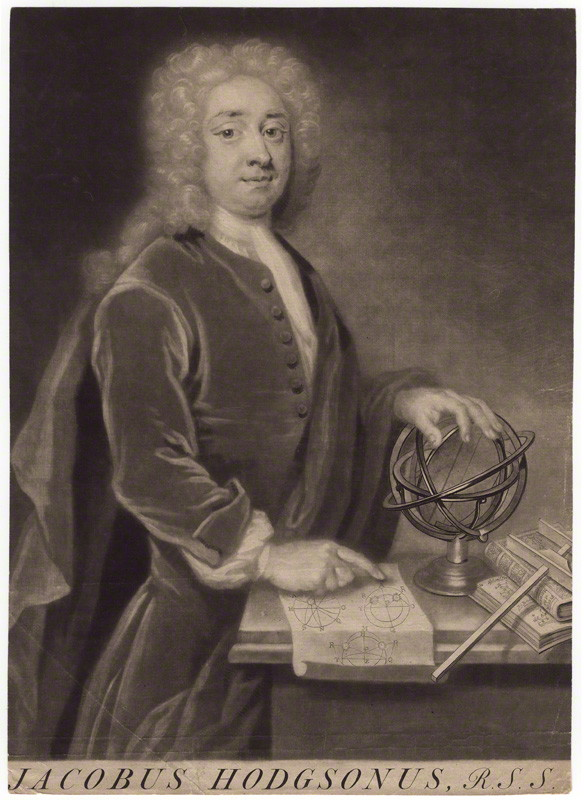
James Hodgson, engraving by George White after Thomas Gibson

== Life ==
The nephew of Christopher Wren, Hodgson was an assistant to the first Astronomer Royal, John Flamsteed, at the Royal Observatory, Greenwich, between 1695 and 1702. In 1703 he was elected Fellow, and in 1733 one of the council, of the Royal Society. He was master of mathematics at the Royal Mathematical School at Christ's Hospital from 1709 until his death. Hodgson married Flamsteed's niece in 1702, took part in the controversies in which Flamsteed was engaged and helped bring his works to posthumous publication. He promoted Flamsteed's work in his textbook A System of the Mathematics (1723) and has been credited with improving standards and examination success at the School.

Hodgson died on 25 June 1755, leaving a widow and several children.

== Works ==
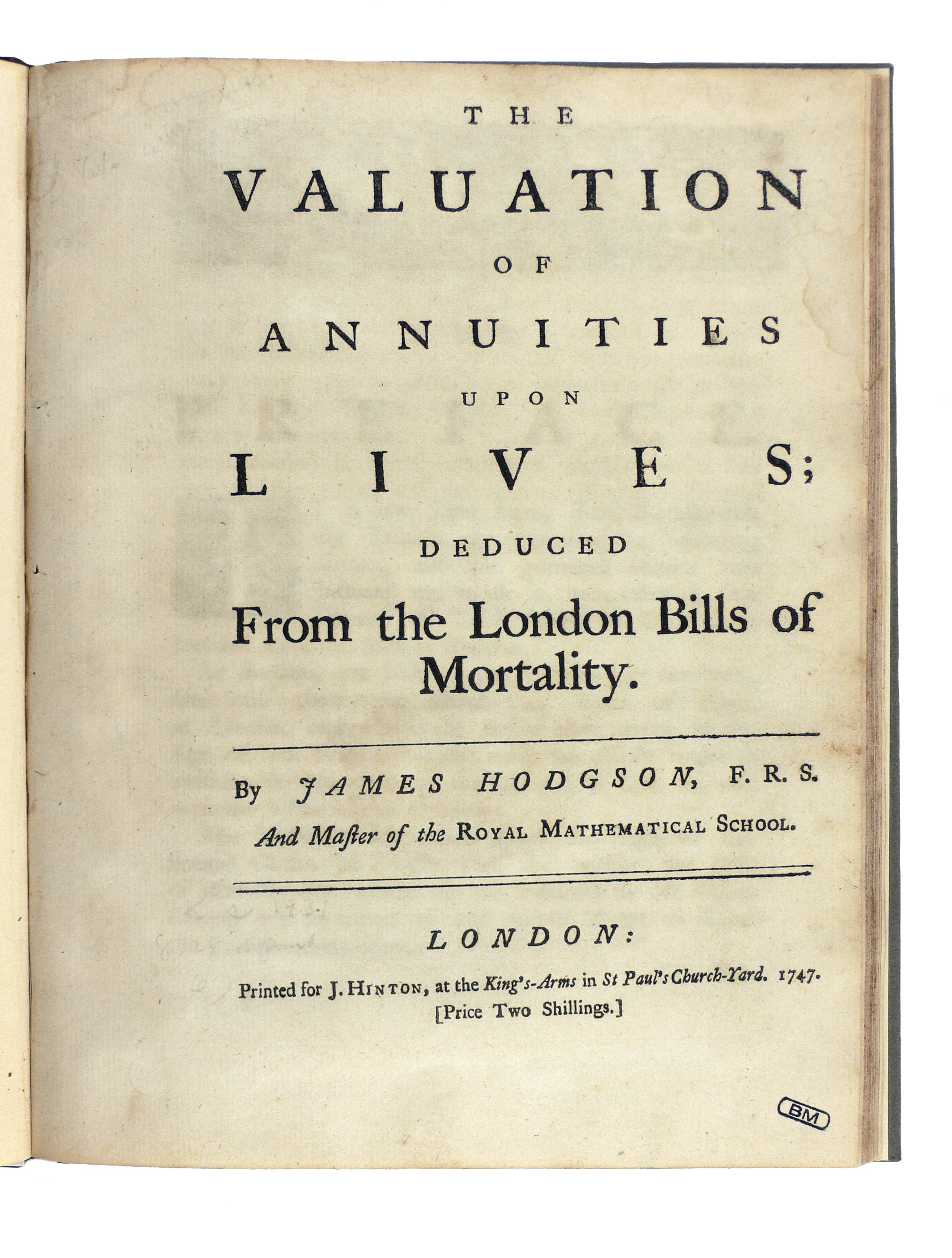
The valuation of annuities upon lives, 1724 .

When Flamsteed died Hodgson assisted his widow in the publication of her husband's works, and he appears as co-editor of the Atlas Cœlestis, published in 1729. The share which Joseph Crosthwaite had in seeing the works through the press was not acknowledged.

Hodgson wrote papers in the Philosophical Transactions (vols. xxxvii–xlix.), and also:

- The Theory of Navigation, 1706.
- The Laws of Stereographick Projection, printed in Miscellanea Curiosa, vol. ii., 1708.
- A System of the Mathematics, 1723.
- The Doctrine of Fluxions founded on Sir Isaac Newton's Method, 1736.
- An Introduction to Chronology, 1747.
- A Treatise on Annuities, 1747.
- The Theory of Jupiter's Satellites, 1750.

He prefixed a short treatise on The Theory of Perspective to the English translation of the French Jesuit Jean Dubreuil's work on perspective, which went to a fourth edition in 1765.

== Notes ==
Attribution

This article incorporates text from a publication now in the public domain: Lee, Sidney, ed. (1891). "Hodgson, James". Dictionary of National Biography. Vol. 27. London: Smith, Elder & Co.
