= William Wales (astronomer) =

English mathematician and astronomer known for serving under James Cook

William Wales (1734? – 29 December 1798) was a British mathematician and astronomer who sailed on Captain Cook's second voyage of discovery, then became Master of the Royal Mathematical School at Christ's Hospital and a Fellow of the Royal Society.

== Early life ==
Wales was born around 1734 to John and Sarah Wales and was baptised in Warmfield (near the West Yorkshire town of Wakefield) that year. As a youth, according to the historian John Cawte Beaglehole, Wales travelled south in the company of a Mr Holroyd, who became a plumber in the service of George III. By the mid-1760s, Wales was contributing to The Ladies' Diary. In 1765 he married Mary Green, sister of the astronomer Charles Green.

In 1765, Wales was employed by the Astronomer Royal Nevil Maskelyne as a computer, calculating ephemerides that could be used to establish the longitude of a ship, for Maskelyne's Nautical Almanac.

== 1769 transit of Venus and wintering at Hudson Bay ==
As part of the plans of the Royal Society to make observations of the June 1769 transit of Venus, which would lead to an accurate determination of the astronomical unit (the distance between the Earth and the Sun), Wales and an assistant, Joseph Dymond, were sent to Prince of Wales Fort on Hudson Bay to observe the transit, with the pair being offered a reward of £200 for a successful conclusion to their expedition. Other Royal Society expeditions associated with the 1769 transit were Cook's first voyage to the Pacific, with observations of the transit being made at Tahiti, and the expedition of Jeremiah Dixon and William Bayly to Norway.

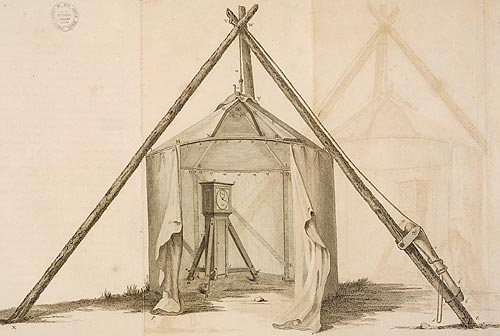
Portable observatory made by William Wales and Willam Bayly

Due to winter pack ice making the journey impossible during the winter months, Wales and Dymond were obliged to begin their journey in the summer of 1768, setting sail on 23 June. Ironically, Wales when volunteering to make a journey to observe the transit, had requested that he be sent to a more hospitable location. The party arrived at Prince of Wales Fort in August 1768.

Due to the scarcity of building materials at the chosen site, the party had to bring not only astronomical instruments, but the materials required for the construction of living quarters. On their arrival, the pair constructed two "Portable Observatories", which had been designed by the engineer John Smeaton. Construction work occupied the pair for a month and then they settled in for the long winter season.

When the day of the transit, 3 June 1769, finally arrived, the pair were lucky to have a reasonably clear day and they were able to observe the transit at around local midday. However, the two astronomers' results for the time of first contact, when Venus first appeared to cross the disc of the Sun, differed by 11 seconds; the discrepancy was to prove a cause of upset for Wales.

They were to stay in Canada for another three months before making the return voyage to England, thus becoming the first scientists to spend the winter at Hudson Bay. On his return, Wales was still upset by the difference in the observations and refused to present his findings to the Royal Society until March 1770; however, his report of the expedition, including the astronomical results as well as other climatic and botanical observations, met with approval and he was invited by James Cook to join his next expedition.

== Captain Cook's second circumnavigation voyage ==
Wales and William Bayly were appointed by the Board of Longitude to accompany James Cook on his second voyage of 1772–75, with Wales accompanying Cook aboard the Resolution. Wales' brother-in-law Charles Green, had been the astronomer appointed by the Royal Society to observe the 1769 transit of Venus but had died during the return leg of Cook's first voyage. The primary objective of Wales and Bayly was to test Larcum Kendall's K1 chronometer, based on the H4 of John Harrison. Wales compiled a log book of the voyage, recording locations and conditions, the use and testing of the instruments entrusted to him, as well as making many observations of the people and places encountered on the voyage.

== Later life ==
Following his return, Wales was commissioned in 1778 to write the official astronomical account of Cook's first voyage.

Wales became Master of the Royal Mathematical School at Christ's Hospital and was elected a Fellow of the Royal Society in 1776. Amongst Wales' pupils at Christ's Hospital were Samuel Taylor Coleridge and Charles Lamb. It has been suggested that Wales' accounts of his journeys might have influenced Coleridge when writing his poem The Rime of the Ancient Mariner. The writer Leigh Hunt, another of Wales' pupils, remembered him as "a good man, of plain simple manners, with a heavy large person and a benign countenance".

He was appointed as Secretary of the Board of Longitude in 1795, serving in that position until his death in 1798. He was nominated by the First Lord of the Admiralty, Earl Spencer, and his appointment confirmed 5 December 1795.

== Recognition of his work ==
During his voyage of 1791–95, George Vancouver, who had studied astronomy under Wales as a midshipman on HMS Resolution during Cook's second circumnavigation, named Wales Point, a cape at the entrance to Portland Inlet on the coast of British Columbia, in honour of his tutor; the name was later applied to the nearby Wales Island by an official at the British Hydrographic Office. In his journal, Vancouver recorded his gratitude and indebtedness to Wales's tutelage "for that information which has enabled me to traverse and delineate these lonely regions."

Wales featured on a New Hebrides (now Vanuatu) postage stamp of 1974 commemorating the 200th anniversary of Cook's discovery of the islands.

The asteroid 15045 Walesdymond, discovered in 1998, was named after Wales and Dymond.

== Works by William Wales ==
- "Journal of a voyage, made by order of the Royal Society, to Churchill River, on the North-west Coast of Hudson's Bay". Philosophical Transactions of the Royal Society of London. 60: 109–136. 1771.
- The Method of Finding the Longitude by timekeepers London: 1794.

== See also ==
- European and American voyages of scientific exploration
- Wales, Wendy (2015). Captain Cook’s Computer: the life of William Wales, F.R.S. (1734-1798). Hame House. ISBN 978-09933758-0-4.

== Sources ==
- Who's Who in Science (Marquis Who's Who Inc, Chicago Ill. 1968) ISBN 0-8379-1001-3
- Francis Lucian Reid "William Wales (ca. 1734–1798): playing the astronomer", Studies in History and Philosophy of Science, 39 (2008) 170–175
