= Plane sailing =

Meridian through point of departure p and the difference in latitude Δφ_{AB} can be worked out with simple trigonometry.

Plane sailing (also, colloquially and historically, spelled plain sailing) is an approximate method of navigation over small ranges of latitude and longitude. With the course and distance known, the difference in latitude Δφ_{AB} between A and B can be found, as well as the departure, the distance made good east or west. The difference in longitude Δλ_{AB} is unknown and has to be calculated using meridional parts as in Mercator sailing.

Both spellings ("plane" and "plain") have been in use for several centuries,

Plane sailing is based on the assumption that the meridian through the point of departure, the parallel through the destination, and the course line form a right triangle in a plane, called the "plane sailing triangle".

The expressions "plane sailing" (or more commonly "plain sailing") has, by analogy, taken on a more general meaning of any activity that is relatively straightforward.

== See also ==
- Great-circle navigation
- Mercator Sailing
- Mid-latitude sailing
- Parallel sailing
- Rhumb line
- Traverse sailing
