= Midshipman ordinary =

Obsolete rating in the British Royal Navy

Midshipman ordinary, or midshipman-by-order, refers to an obsolete rating for prospective officers in the British Royal Navy. The rating was specifically applied to graduates of the Royal Naval Academy who had earned their sea time in a classroom instead of serving at sea.

== History ==
In 1729, the Royal Naval Academy in Portsmouth, renamed the Royal Naval College in 1806, was founded, for 40 students between 13 and 16, who would take three years to complete a course of study defined in an illustrated book. After graduation students served on ships as midshipmen. The rating was used specifically for graduates of the Royal Naval College to distinguish them from midshipmen who had served previously aboard a ship, and were paid less than midshipmen. By 1816, the rating of midshipman ordinary was phased out, and all apprentice officers were rated as midshipmen. After 1830, Midshipman extraordinary was used to refer to Royal Naval College graduates who were serving on board a ship but were not rated as midshipmen by the captain.

== Bibliography ==
- Lavery, Brian (1989), Nelson's Navy: The Ships, Men and Organization, Annapolis, MD: Naval Institute Press, ISBN 0-87021-258-3, OCLC 20997619
- Lewis, Michael (1960), A Social History of the Navy, London: Ruskin House, OCLC 2832855
