= Royal Naval Academy =

Military education facility in the UK (1733–1873)

Coordinates: 50.8000°N 1.1055°W

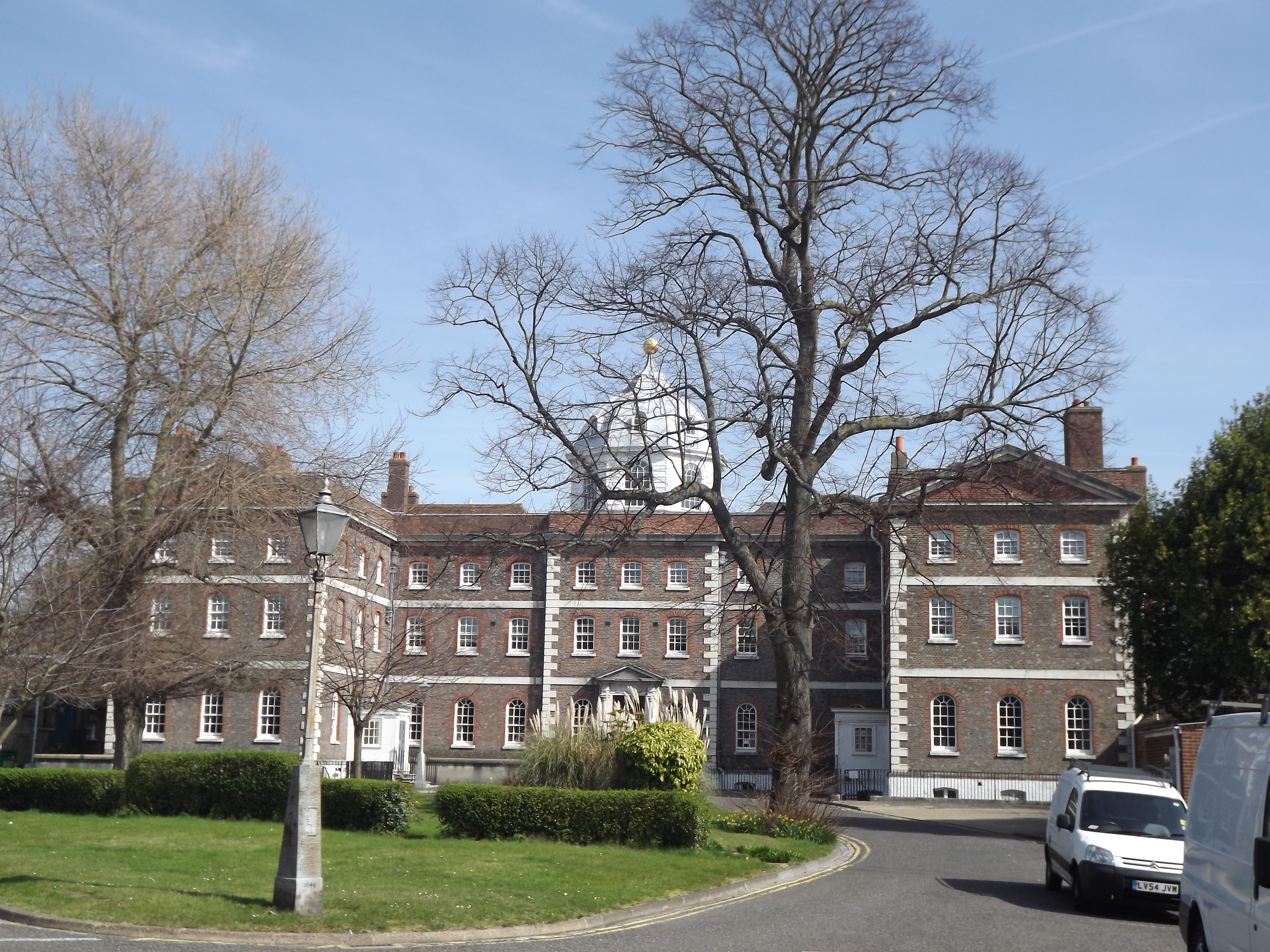
- Royal Naval Academy, Portsmouth
- Active: 1733–1873
- Country: United Kingdom
- Branch: Royal Navy
- Type: Training
- Role: Officer training

The Royal Naval Academy was a naval academy to train officers for the Royal Navy. It was established in Portsmouth Dockyard in 1733. The founders' intentions were to provide an alternative means to recruit officers and to provide standardised training, education and admission. In 1806 it was renamed the Royal Naval College and in 1816 became the Royal Naval College and the School for Naval Architecture. It was closed as a training establishment for officer entrants in 1837 and for lieutenants and above in 1873.

== Training ==
In 1733, a shoreside facility was established in the dockyard for 40 recruits. A comprehensive syllabus provided theoretical and practical experience in the dockyard and at sea. Graduates of the academy could earn two years of sea time as part of their studies, and would be able to take the lieutenant's examination after four years at sea instead of six. The academy did not, however, achieve the objective of becoming the preferred path to becoming a naval officer; the traditional means of a sea-going "apprenticeship" remained the preferred alternative. The vast majority of the officer class was still recruited in this manner based on family ties, and patronage. Family connections, "interest" and a sincere belief in the superiority of practical experience learned on the quarterdeck ensured that the officer class favoured the traditional model. William IV summed up this view when he remarked that "there was no place superior to the quarterdeck of a British man of war for the education of a gentleman".

There was a clear prejudice against graduates. The then rating of midshipman-by-order, or midshipman ordinary, was used specifically for graduates of the Royal Naval Academy, to distinguish them from midshipmen who had served aboard ship, who were paid more. After two years at sea, graduates of the academy were eligible to be promoted to midshipman.

In 1806 the academy was reconstituted as the "Royal Navy College" and in 1816 was amalgamated with the "School of Naval Architecture".

The college closed as a young officer training establishment on 30 March 1837, meaning that from that date all youngsters setting out on a naval career proceeded directly to sea. Nevertheless, it continued as an institution where the students studied for their lieutenant's exam. The closure of the college for new entrants created a gap in officer training, and in 1857 the two-decker Illustrious undertook the role of cadet training ship at Portsmouth. In 1859 she was replaced by the three-decker Britannia, which was removed to Portland in 1862 and to Dartmouth in 1863. Meanwhile, training for lieutenants and above moved to the Royal Naval College, Greenwich in 1873.

== Notable individuals ==
A distinguished Academy graduate was Philip Broke, who attended the academy in 1791. He achieved particular fame as captain of HMS Shannon in its victory over USS Chesapeake in the War of 1812. Two of Jane Austen's brothers, Francis and Charles, attended the academy in 1786 and 1791, respectively. Both went on to become admirals.

Another veteran of the War of 1812, Henry Ducie Chads, attended the academy before joining the Royal Navy. He was First Lieutenant of HMS Java during her capture by USS Constitution. Command of the ship fell to Chads when her captain was mortally wounded near the close of the action. He was forced to surrender the heavily damaged Java.

== Governors ==
=== Governors ===
- 26 June 1733 – 1754: Captain Richard Hughes
- 25 August 1773 – 23 January 1778 Captain James Gambier
- 6 November 1780 – 29 March 1790: Captain Henry Martin

=== Lieutenant-Governors ===
- 23 March 1807 – 12 August 1819: Captain John Giffard
- 1819: Captain John Wainwright
- 4 November 1819 – 10 January 1837: Captain John Wentworth Loring

== Masters ==
- 1733–1740 Thomas Haselden, FRS
- 1740–1755 John Walton
- 1755–1766 John Robertson, FRS
- 1766–1785 George Witchell, FRS
- 1785–1807 William Bayly
- 1807–1838 James Inman as Professor of the Royal Naval College
