= List of people educated at Christ's Hospital =

This is a list of alumni of Christ's Hospital school, who are known as Old Blues.

== Business ==
- Edward Colston – Merchant, slave trader, philanthropist, and Member of Parliament
- Arthur Dorman – Industrialist
- William Charles Goddard Knowles – British businessman in Hong Kong
- David Norgrove – Businessman
- John Pound – Luggage manufacturer and Lord Mayor of London
- Stephan Shakespeare – Businessman and entrepreneur
- David Simon – Businessman
- James White – Advertising agent
- Richard Thornton – Merchant and trader

== Law ==
- Edmund Bartley-Denniss – Barrister, Member of Parliament, freemason and British cycling pioneer
- Francis Bullen – Judge
- Rupert Jackson – Lord Justice of Appeal
- Gabriel Jones – Welsh American lawyer, legislator, court clerk and civil servant in the colony (and later U.S. state) of Virginia
- Henry James Sumner Maine – Comparative jurist and historian

== Medicine ==
- Russell Brock – Chest and heart surgeon
- Raanan Gillon – Medical doctor, philosopher, journal editor and professor of medical ethics
- Norman Guthkelch – British paediatric neurosurgeon
- Caesar Hawkins – Surgeon
- James Jurin – Physician and scientist
- Berkeley Moynihan – Abdominal surgeon

== Military ==
- Bertram Allen – Paymaster Rear-Admiral in the Royal Navy
- Bob Allen – Army surgeon and journalist
- Thomas Bertie – Rear-admiral in the Royal Navy
- Edward Felix Baxter – Soldier (awarded the Victoria Cross in 1916)
- Pierre Louis Napoleon Cavagnari – Military administrator
- John Colborne – British Army Field Marshal
- Hugh Constantine – Royal Air Force Air Chief Marshal
- Edgar William Cox – Intelligence officer
- Alexander Cunningham – Army engineer and archaeologist
- James Alfred Davidson – Royal Navy commander
- Edward Mortlock Donaldson – Royal Air Force pilot
- William F.S. Edwards – commonly referred to as Brig General W. F. S. Edwards, 1st colonial Commissioner of Police in East Africa
- Michael Gray – Soldier
- Wilfrith Elstob – Soldier (awarded the Victoria Cross in 1918)
- Buster Howes – Commando and Royal Marines officer
- Llewelyn Hughes – Soldier, priest and army chaplain
- Robert Hunter – Soldier
- Joshua Leakey – Soldier (awarded the Victoria Cross in 2013)
- Henry Ralph Lumley – Royal Flying Corp pilot and burn victim
- Philip Mayne – Soldier
- Henry William Pitcher – British Indian Army officer (awarded the Victoria Cross in 1863)
- Laurence Sinclair – Air Vice Marshal in the Royal Air Force (Awarded the George Cross in 1941)
- John Robin Stephenson – British Army officer and cricket administrator
- Harold Edward Whittingham – Director General of RAF Medical Services in the Second World War
- Thomas Withers, a naval officer who served with Nelson

== Music ==
- Attila the Stockbroker
- Basil Allchin – Oxford organist
- Adrian Bawtree – Organist
- Sydney Carter – Poet, songwriter, musician
- Sir Colin Davis – Conductor
- Tim Benjamin – Composer
- Catherine Ennis – organist
- Charles Hazlewood – Conductor and broadcaster
- Constant Lambert – Composer and conductor
- Edward Lambert – Composer
- Christopher Tambling – Composer, organist and choirmaster

== Performing arts ==
- Roger Allam – Actor
- James D'Arcy – Actor
- Howard Davies – Theatre and television director
- Tenniel Evans – Actor
- Susannah Fielding – Actor
- Jason Flemyng – Actor
- Jimmy Godden – Actor
- Leo Gregory – Actor
- George Peele – Dramatist
- Michael Wilding – Actor

== Politics ==
- Jenkin Coles – Australian politician
- Owen Cox – Australian businessman and politician
- Thomas Everard – Mayor of Williamsburg, Virginia
- Samuel Hayden – Canadian politician
- Steve Hilton – Political strategist
- Stuart Holland – Labour politician and academic
- Graham Hutton – Economist, author and Liberal Party politician
- Martin Linton – former Labour Member of Parliament
- Richard Nichols – Lord Mayor of London
- Michael Stewart – Labour politician
- Alexander Vidal – Canadian land surveyor, banker and political figure

== Religion ==
- John Arnold – Anglican priest and author
- John Ashe – Priest
- Reginald Bazire – Anglican priest
- Raymond Birt – Archdeacon of Berkshire
- Constance Bryant – Medical missionary
- Edmund Campion – Jesuit priest, martyr and saint
- Mordecai Cary – Bishop
- Thomas Dale – Anglican priest, poet and theologian
- John Delight – Archdeacon of Stoke
- Vyvyan Henry Donnithorne – Priest and missionary to China
- Robert Newton Flew – Methodist theologian
- Bede Griffiths – Monk, mystic, theologian, leader in the study of East–West religious dialogue
- Thomas Hartwell Horne – Theologian and librarian
- Percy Henn – Clergyman and schoolmaster
- James Horstead – Bishop of Sierra Leone and Archbishop of West Africa
- Ross Hook – Anglican bishop
- Marcus Knight – Anglican priest
- Thomas Middleton – Anglican bishop
- John Townsend – Congregationalist minister and philanthropist

== Science and academia ==
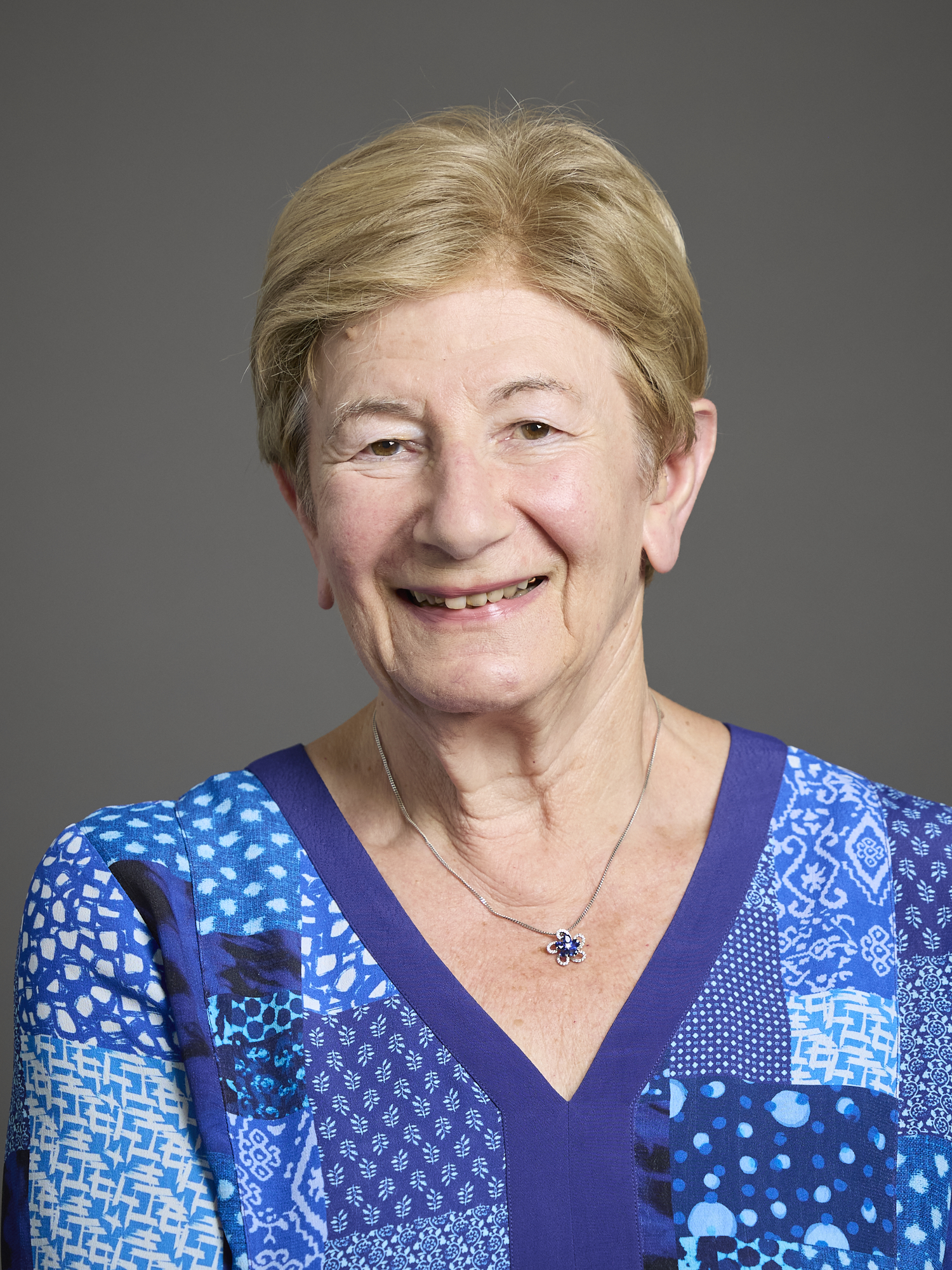
Baroness Deech

- Donald Allan – Classical scholar
- W. Sidney Allen – Linguist and philologist
- Richard Appleton – Lecturer in mathematics and theology
- Andrew Barker – Classical scholar
- Joshua Barnes – English scholar
- John Beazley – Classical scholar
- Alan Bishop – Palaeographer, historian, and academic
- Arthur Lyon Bowley – Statistician and economist
- James Boyer – Clergyman and headmaster of Christ's Hospital
- Rupert Bruce-Mitford – Archaeologist and scholar
- Andrew Burn – Media scholar and educationist
- William Burnside – Mathematician
- Cyril Burt – Psychologist
- Ida Busbridge – Mathematician
- William Camden – Antiquarian and historian
- T. H. Clark – Geologist
- Ruth Deech – Academic, lawyer and bioethicist
- Robin Du Boulay – Medieval historian
- Frederick Field – Theologian and biblical scholar
- John Forsdyke – Classical scholar and Director of the British Museum
- Cyril Fox – Archaeologist
- Louis Harold Gray – Physicist
- George Greenhill – Mathematician
- Jasper Griffin – Professor of Classics at Oxford
- Philip Hall – Mathematician
- Roger Highfield – Science author, journalist and broadcaster
- Sydney Samuel Hough – Astronomer and mathematician
- Beresford Kidd – Anglican priest and Church historian
- Philip Kitcher – Professor of philosophy
- Richard Lodge – Historian
- Norman Longmate – Author, historian and broadcaster
- Jeremiah Markland – Classical scholar
- Russell Meiggs – Historian
- Peter Padfield – Historian
- Rex Paterson – Agricultural researcher
- Alan Ryan – Professor
- James Scholefield – Classical scholar
- Arthur William Trollope – Cleric and headmaster of Christ's Hospital
- Barnes Wallis – Scientist, engineer and inventor
- Gerald James Whitrow – Mathematician, cosmologist and science historian
- F. L. Woodward – Educationist, Pali scholar, author and theosophist
- Erik Christopher Zeeman – Mathematician

== Sport ==
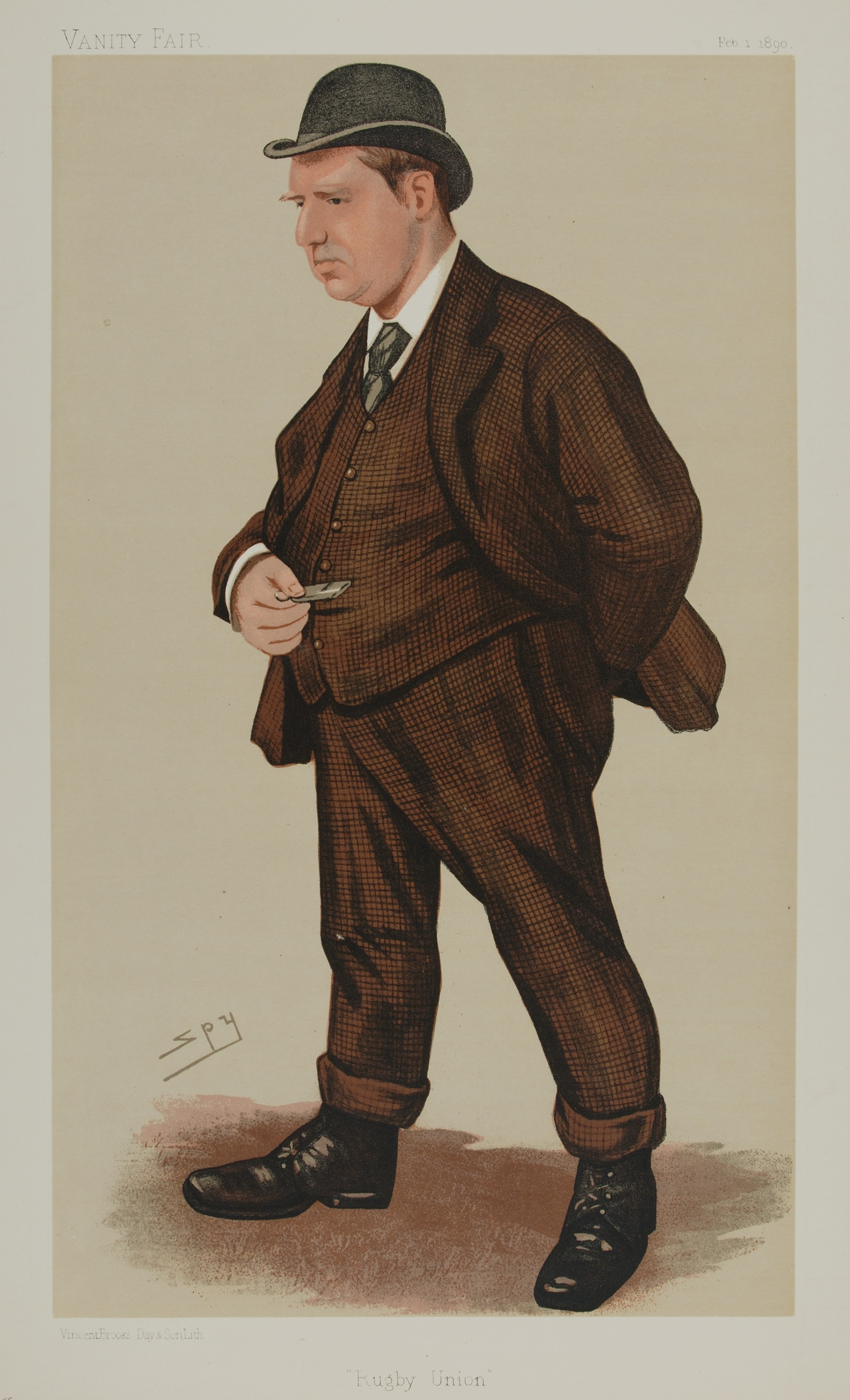
George Rowland Hill

- Jack Bailey – Cricketer and cricket administrator
- Cecil Boden – Cricketer
- Robert Edwards – Cricketer and clergyman
- Henry Franklin – Cricketer, headmaster and rugby union player
- Jack Gentry – Cricketer
- Ælfric Harrison – Cricketer
- Andrew Higgins – Rugby union player
- George Rowland Hill – Rugby union administrator, official and referee
- Joe Launchbury – Rugby union player
- James McInerny – Cricketer
- Dennis Silk – Schoolmaster and international cricketer
- Geoff Smith – Kent cricketer
- John Snow – Cricketer
- Stu Whittingham – Cricketer
- Douglas Wright – Cricketer

== Visual arts ==
- Richard Dagley – Painter and illustrator
- Alan Fletcher – Designer and founder of Pentagram
- Francis Seymour Haden – Etcher and surgeon
- Arthur Ling – architect and urban planner
- Augustus Welby Northmore Pugin – Architect, designer, artist and critic
- Tony Ray-Jones – Photographer
- Jonathan Scott – Wildlife photographer and TV presenter
- Chris Steele-Perkins – Photographer
- Keith Vaughan – Painter

== Writers, poets and journalists ==
- Cyrus Andrews – Journalist and radio scriptwriter
- Attila the Stockbroker (John Baine) – Punk poet and musician
- Thomas Barnes – Journalist
- Robert Black – Author, journalist and translator
- Edmund Blunden – Poet, author and critic
- Guy Boothby – Author
- Mark Burgess – Children's author
- Samuel Cobb – Poet
- Kira Cochrane – Journalist and author
- Samuel Taylor Coleridge – Poet, romantic, literary critic and philosopher
- James Coomarasamy – Correspondent
- Con Coughlin – Journalist and author
- Keith Douglas – Poet
- George Dyer – Poet
- Nicholas Foulkes – Journalist, writer, and broadcaster
- Leigh Hunt – Critic, essayist, and poet
- Charles Lamb – Essayist
- Bernard Levin – Journalist, author and broadcaster
- Bryan Magee – Broadcaster, politician, and author
- Aylmer Maude – Translator
- John Middleton Murry – Writer
- Horace W. C. Newte – Author
- Thomas Richards – Surgeon, Author, Journalist, Editor
- Samuel Richardson – Writer
- Michael Schmidt – Poet, Author, Scholar and Publisher
- Thomas Skinner Surr – Writer
- Chris Simms – Crime novelist
- Rupert Thomson – Novelist
- Ian Trethowan – Former Director-General of the BBC and journalist

== Other ==
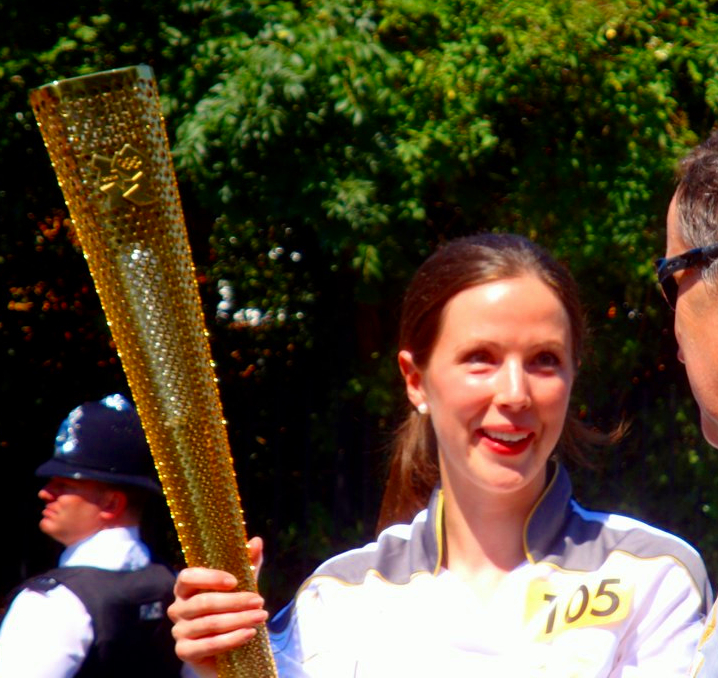
Lucy Herron holding the Olympic Torch in 2012

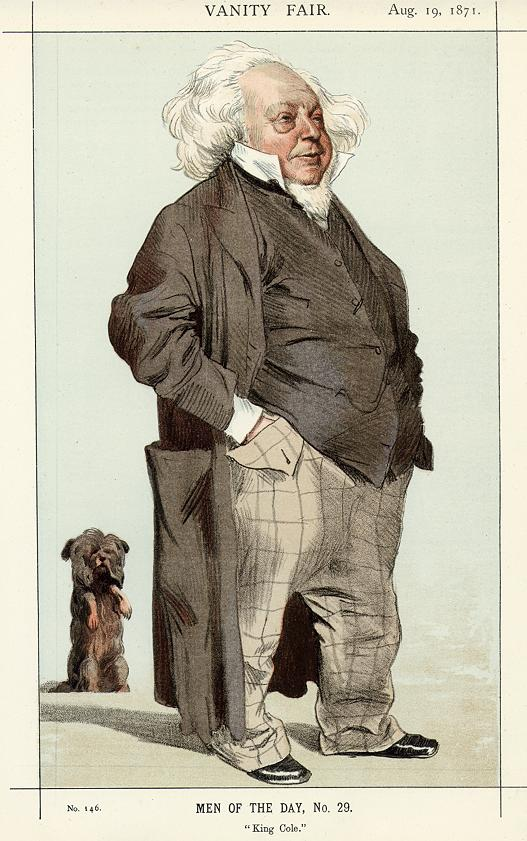
Caricature of Henry Cole

- William Bankes Amery – Civil servant and accountant
- Thomas Cass – Surveyor
- Richard Cavendish – Occult writer
- Richard Clarke – Civil servant
- Henry Cole – Civil servant and inventor
- Jeremiah Duggan, who died in disputed circumstances in 2003
- John Edmonds – Trade union leader
- Rob Gauntlett – Adventurer, explorer and motivational speaker
- David Green – Director of the Serious Fraud Office
- Harold Harding – Civil engineer
- Daniel Harper – Headmaster and Principal of Jesus College, Oxford
- Lucy Herron – Founder and director of charity Msizi Africa
- James Hooper – Adventurer
- Donald Hopson – Diplomat
- Geraint Jennings – Jersey politician and linguist
- Edward Keane – Australian engineer, businessman, and politician
- William Nye – Principal Private Secretary to the Prince of Wales and the Duchess of Cornwall, 2011–2015
- Percy Pyne – President of City National Bank in the United States
- John Septimus Roe – Surveyor-General of Western Australia
- George Ritchie Sandford – Barrister, Financial Secretary of Palestine (1940–1944), Chief Secretary of Tanganyika (1944–1946), Governor of the Bahamas (1950)
- Charles Robert Smith – Governor of North Borneo
- William Alder Strange – Headmaster and author
- Mark Thomas – Comedian and political activist
- Edward Thornton – Diplomat
- Holly Walsh – Comedian
- E F Watling – Schoolmaster, classical scholar and translator
