= Old Blues =

Old Blues may refer to the following:

- Former pupils of Bluecoat schools including:
  - Christ's Hospital, Horsham, West Sussex, United Kingdom - see List of people educated at Christ's Hospital & Category:People educated at Christ's Hospital
  - Reading Blue Coat School - see Category:People educated at Reading Blue Coat School
