= Arthur William Trollope =

Arthur William Trollope (1768–1827) was an English cleric and headmaster of Christ's Hospital from 1799.

== Life ==
Baptised on 30 September 1768, Trollope was the son of Thomas Trollope, a mercer in London. He entered Christ's Hospital in 1775 and received his education there till 1787, when he matriculated at Pembroke College, Cambridge. He graduated B.A. in 1791, M.A. in 1794, and D.D. in 1815, and was known as a classical scholar. In 1795 he was awarded the Seatonian prize for an English poem, the subject being the Destruction of Babylon. In 1796 he was appointed vicar of Ugley and perpetual curate of St Nicholas' Church, Berden in Essex.

In 1799, on the resignation of James Boyer, Trollope was elected headmaster of Christ's Hospital. Among his pupils were Thomas Barnes, George Townsend, and James Scholefield.

In 1814 Trollope was presented to the rectory of Colne-Engaine in Essex by the governors of Christ's Hospital, and resigned his preferments at Ugley and Berden. He resigned his post at the school on 28 November 1826, and was succeeded by the second master, John Greenwood.

Trollope died at Colne-Engaine rectory on 24 May 1827. He was a Fellow of the Society of Antiquaries of London.

== Family ==
Trollope married Sarah, the daughter of William Wales, master of the Royal Mathematical School. They had a large family, the eldest son being William (1798–1863), an author.

== Notes ==
This article incorporates text from a publication now in the public domain: Lee, Sidney, ed. (1899). "Trollope, Arthur William". Dictionary of National Biography. Vol. 57. London: Smith, Elder & Co.
