= Cleitarchus of Aegina =

Ancient Greek grammarian

Cleitarchus (Ancient Greek: Κλείταρχος ἐξ Αἰγίνης), originally from Aegina, was a grammarian and lexicographer active in either the 1st or 2nd century BC. He wrote a seven-book treatise titled "Languages" or "On Languages", in which he presented the peculiarities of various Greek dialects and interpreted a multitude of idiomatic words, as well as words derived from specialized professional glossaries.

Cleitarchus and his work are mentioned by Athenaeus, Proclus, Harpocration, and the Byzantine Etymologicum Magnum among others.

All the surviving fragments were collected and published in 1842 in Berlin.

== Bibliography ==
- Athenaeus. Deipnosophists. Vol. Book VII.
- Hofinger, Marcel (1985). Lexicon Hesiodeum (in French). Brill.
- Harpocration's Lexicon (in Greek). Vol. I. 1824. "Epileptas, Lysias in the case against Nicias, if genuine. Epibleptas is, as Timachidas says, a beam; but according to Cleitarchus the glossographer, it is a kind of beam."
- "Entry on Bruchos". Mega Etymologicon (in Greek). Lipsiae Apud J.A.G. Weigel. 1816. "Cleitarchus says that according to the Ambraciots, the grasshopper is called mastax."
- Pavlos Drandakis, ed. (1926–1934). Great Greek Encyclopedia (Μεγάλη Ελληνική Εγκυκλοπαίδεια) (in Greek).
