= Henry Lumley (disambiguation) =

Henry Lumley was a British soldier and Governor of Jersey.

Henry Lumley may also refer to:

- Henry Lumley, Viscount Lumley (c. 1685–1710), British nobleman and politician
- Henry de Lumley (born 1934), French archeologist, geologist and prehistorian
- Henry Ralph Lumley (1892–1918), First World War pilot and burn victim

== See also ==
- Harry Lumley (disambiguation)
