= Harry Lumley =

Harry Lumley may refer to:

- Harry Lumley (baseball) (1880–1938), right fielder and manager in Major League Baseball
- Harry Lumley (ice hockey) (1926–1998), ice hockey goaltender

== See also ==
- Henry Lumley (disambiguation)
