= Sheffield Collegiate School =

School in Sheffield, England

Coordinates: 53.376°N 1.495°W

Information
- Established: 1836; 190 years ago
- Closed: 1885; 141 years ago

Sheffield Collegiate School began in 1836 in new buildings on the corner of Ecclesall Road and Collegiate Crescent (now Grade II listed and part of Sheffield Hallam University). The school enjoyed academic success but lacked sound finances. In 1884, the Governors of Sheffield Grammar School paid £7,000 to buy the school, which ceased to exist. The grammar school moved onto the site and the next year was renamed as Sheffield Royal Grammar School.

In 1905 Sheffield City Council acquired both Wesley College and SRGS and they were merged on the site of the former to form King Edward VII School (KES), named after the reigning monarch.

== Headmasters of Sheffield Collegiate School ==
- 1836–1842 Thomas W. Mellor, M.A.|
- 1843–1853 George A. Jacob, M.A. DD
- 1853–1855 William S. Grignon, M.A.|
- 1856–1860 Edward D. Ward, M.A
- 1861–1871 George B. Atkinson, M.A.
- 1872–1879 James Cardwell, M.A.
- 1880–1884 John J. Dyson, M.A.

== Notable alumni of Sheffield Collegiate School ==
- John Cordeaux (1831–1899) – ornithologist
- Nathaniel Creswick (1826–1917) – co-founder of Sheffield F.C. and the Sheffield Rules
- Henry Jackson (1839–1921) – Regius Professor of Greek at the University of Cambridge
- George Rolleston (1829–1881) – Linacre Professor of Anatomy and Physiology at the University of Oxford
- Henry Clifton Sorby (1826–1908) – scientist, microscopist

== Notable staff of Sheffield Collegiate School ==
- Alfred Ainger (1837–1904) – English divine and man of letters, assistant master 1864–66
- Richard Deodatus Poulett-Harris – Second Master at Collegiate School (1843), then Rector of Hobart Town High School in Tasmania
- Charles Warren (1843–1919) – clergyman, cricketer, Vice-Principal from 1868 to 1869
