= Charles Warren (cricketer, born 1843) =

English clergyman and cricketer

Personal information
- Full name: Charles Warren
- Born: 20 December 1843; Cambridge, Cambridgeshire, England
- Died: 29 April 1919 (aged 75); Sidmouth, Devon, England
- Batting: Right-handed

Domestic team information
- Years: Team
- 1865–1867: Cambridgeshire
- 1866: Cambridge University

Career statistics
Competition	First-class
Matches	20
Runs scored	577
Batting average	18.61
100s/50s	–/3
Top score	73
Catches/stumpings	5/–
- Source: Cricinfo, 25 January 2023

Charles Warren (20 December 1843 – 29 April 1919) was an English clergyman and a cricketer who played in first-class cricket matches for Cambridgeshire County Cricket Club during its fleeting first-class period, for Cambridge University and for other amateur teams between 1865 and 1874. He was born at Cambridge and died at Sidmouth, Devon.

Warren was the son of a Cambridge grocer and was educated at Oakham School and at St John's College, Cambridge. As a cricketer, Warren played as a batsman, sometimes used as an opener, but it is not known whether he was right- or left-handed. He played for Cambridgeshire in two games in 1865, and then in 1866 appeared regularly and with some success for both the county team and the university side, as well as in the important North v South match, one of the big fixtures of the season at the time. For Cambridge University, he scored 72 batting at No 3 against R. D. Walker's XI and he improved on that by one run in a match two weeks later for Cambridgeshire against Nottinghamshire. At the end of the 1866 university cricket season, he played in the University Match against Oxford University, and his unbeaten 37 in the first innings was Cambridge's highest score of the match. He played unsuccessfully for Cambridgeshire in 1867 and reappeared in a single game for a so-called "England XI" in 1874, also without success.

Warren graduated from Cambridge University with a Bachelor of Arts degree in 1866 and this converted to a Master of Arts in 1869. From 1868, he spent a year as vice-principal of Sheffield Collegiate School, but then was ordained as a Church of England deacon and, in 1870, as a priest. He was a curate and then a vicar at a succession of parishes in Lincolnshire, ending up as vicar of St Michael on the Mount's Church in Lincoln from 1898 to 1915, when he retired. He died at Sidmouth in April 1919.
