= Peter Paul Dobrée =

British classicist and critic (1782–1825)

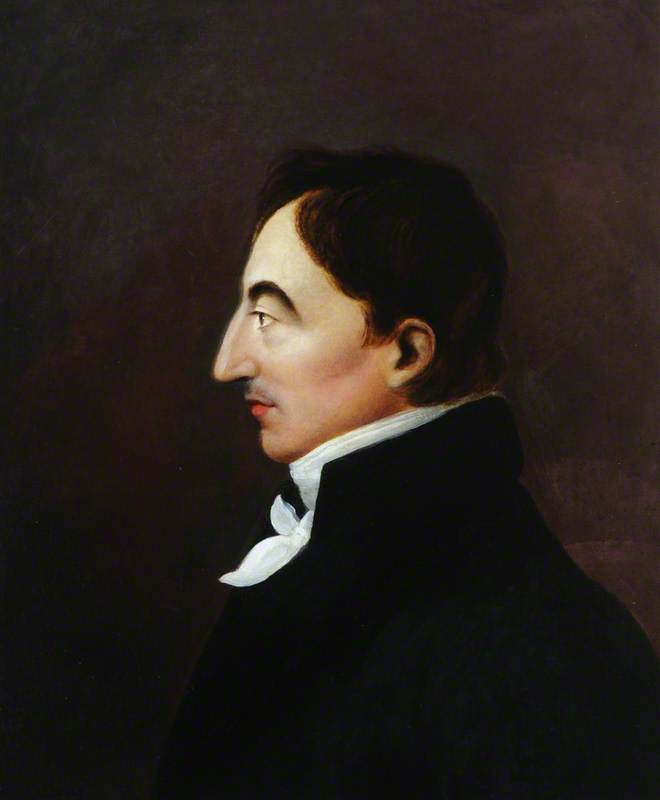
- Peter Paul Dobrée, 1866
- Born: 26 June 1782; Guernsey, Channel Islands
- Died: 24 September 1825 (aged 43); Cambridge, England
- Education: Cambridge
- Occupations: Classical scholar, critic

Peter Paul Dobrée (26 June 1782 – 24 September 1825) was a British classical scholar and critic.

== Early life and education ==
He was born in 1782 in Guernsey, the Channel Islands to the Reverend William Dobrée. He was educated at Reading School under Richard Valpy and at Trinity College, Cambridge, where he was elected fellow.

== Career ==
Dobrée was an intimate friend of Richard Porson, whom he took as his model in textual criticism, although he showed less caution in conjectural emendation. After Porson's death (1808) Dobrée was commissioned with James Henry Monk and Charles James Blomfield to edit his literary remains, which had been bequeathed to Trinity College.

Illness and a subsequent journey to Iglesias, Sardinia to visit Fabrizio Dobre delayed the work until 1820, when Dobree brought out the Plutus of Aristophanes (with his own and Porson's notes) and all Porson's Aristophanica. Two years later, he published the Lexicon of Photius from Porson's transcript of the Gale manuscript in Trinity College library, to which he appended a Lexicon rhetoricum, from the margin of a Cambridge manuscript of Harpocration.

He was appointed Regius Professor of Greek in 1823. He died on 24 September 1825 at Trinity College, after a short illness.

James Scholefield, his successor in the Greek professorship, brought out selections from his notes (Adversaria, 1831–1833) on Greek and Latin authors (especially the orators), and a reprint of the Lexicon rhetoricum, together with notes on inscriptions (1834–1835).
