= Bruce Grindlay =

British musician

Bruce Grindlay (born 1967) is a British organist, conductor, teacher and was previously the Headmaster at Sutton Valence School.

Grindlay finished his schooling in Canada and studied at the Royal Canadian College of Organists as well as the Royal Conservatory of Music and the University of British Columbia. In 1988, Grindlay took up an organ scholarship at Emmanuel College, Cambridge and studied with Peter Hurford. After graduating, Grindlay gained a Bachelor of Music at Cambridge University, specialising in organ performance and Henry Purcell. Grindlay was Head of Chapel Music and a housemaster at Bedford School from 1994 until 2001 where he took up the post of Director of Music at Christ's Hospital. As of July 2009, he has left to become Headmaster of Sutton Valence School.

As well as being Director of Music, Bruce is a Fellow of the Royal College of Organists, Chairman of the Music Masters' and Mistresses' Association academic sub-committee, a member of the government's National Music Education Forum and on the music advisory board of the Qualifications and Curriculum Authority. He frequently conducts different choirs, including Christ's Hospital's Schola Cantorum. He has given organ recitals across the country in festivals and cathedrals. He has broadcast on both English and Canadian radio and has made several recordings. Grindlay has arranged many hymns especially for Christ's Hospital.

Grindlay is married to his wife, Lilla who is Head of English at The King’s School, Canterbury and the author of the academic book Queen of Heaven. They have two children, Jessica and Samuel.

Academic offices
Preceded by Peter Allwood	Director of Music at Christ's Hospital; 2001–09	Succeeded by Adrian Bawtree
