= Christ's Hospital Band =

Marching band of Christ's Hospital

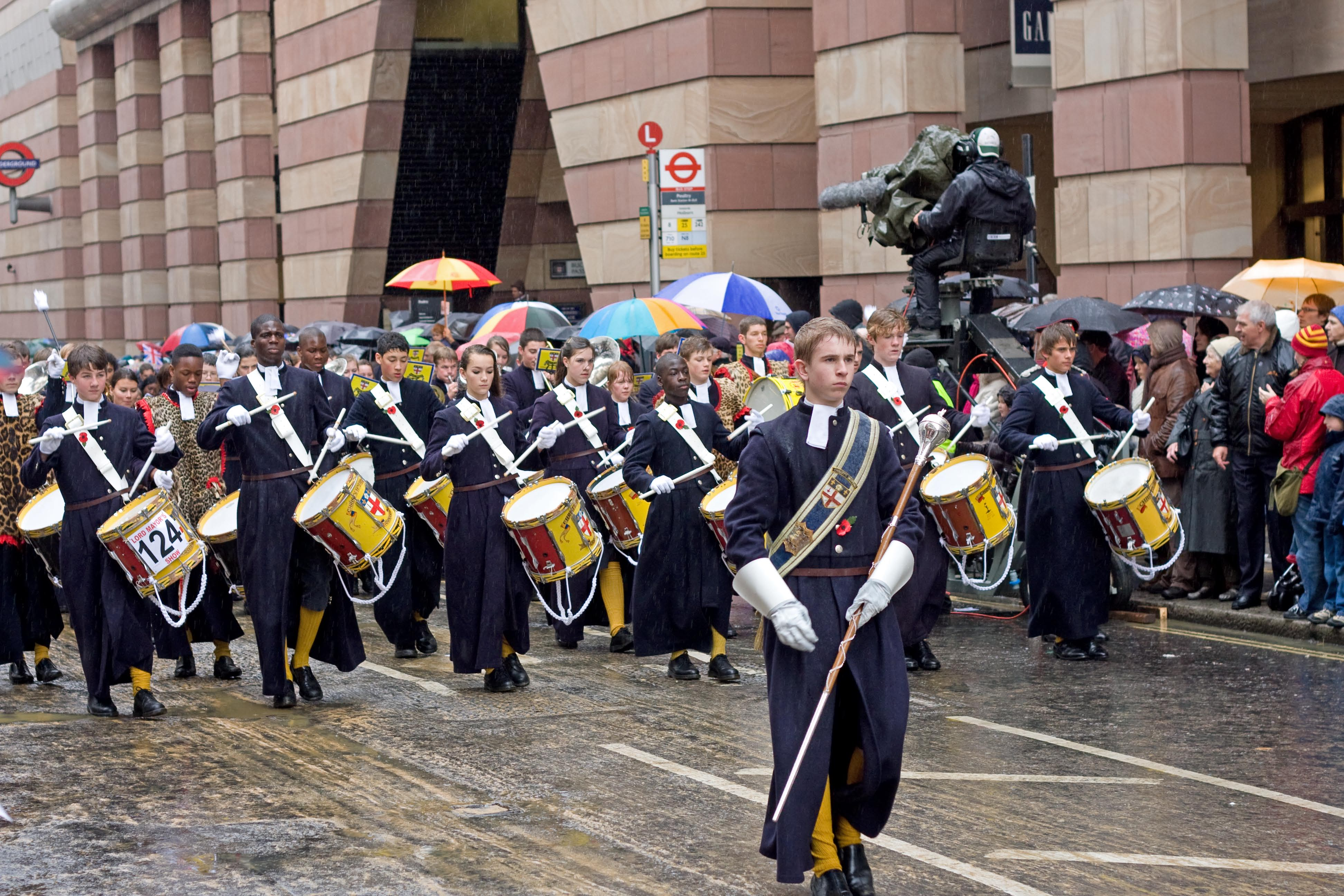
- The Christ's Hospital Band participating in the Lord Mayor's Show in 2011
- School: Christ's Hospital
- Location: Christ's Hospital, Horsham, West Sussex, England
- Founded: 1868
- Members/size: About 110
- Uniform: The CH school uniform "Housey" (although ceremonial wear is worn when necessary)
- March: Quick March - "Sussex by the Sea"

Christ's Hospital Band is the marching band of Christ's Hospital. The band is a leading UK school band and performs a wide variety of engagements nationally and internationally.

== History ==
The band's origin dates back to the mid-19th century when some of the pupils requested that instruments be purchased to enliven their marching drill. The treasurer of Christ's Hospital agreed and, with money from his own pocket, purchased a few instruments and paid the salary of the first band master. Over the years, the band has grown from a small static group to a dynamic and highly trained group of musicians. At some point in the history of the band, the march "Sussex by the Sea" was adopted as the celebratory march and is played as a finale at special occasions, usually as the band marches off.

== Ensembles ==
- Marching band
- Concert band
- Big band

== Formation ==
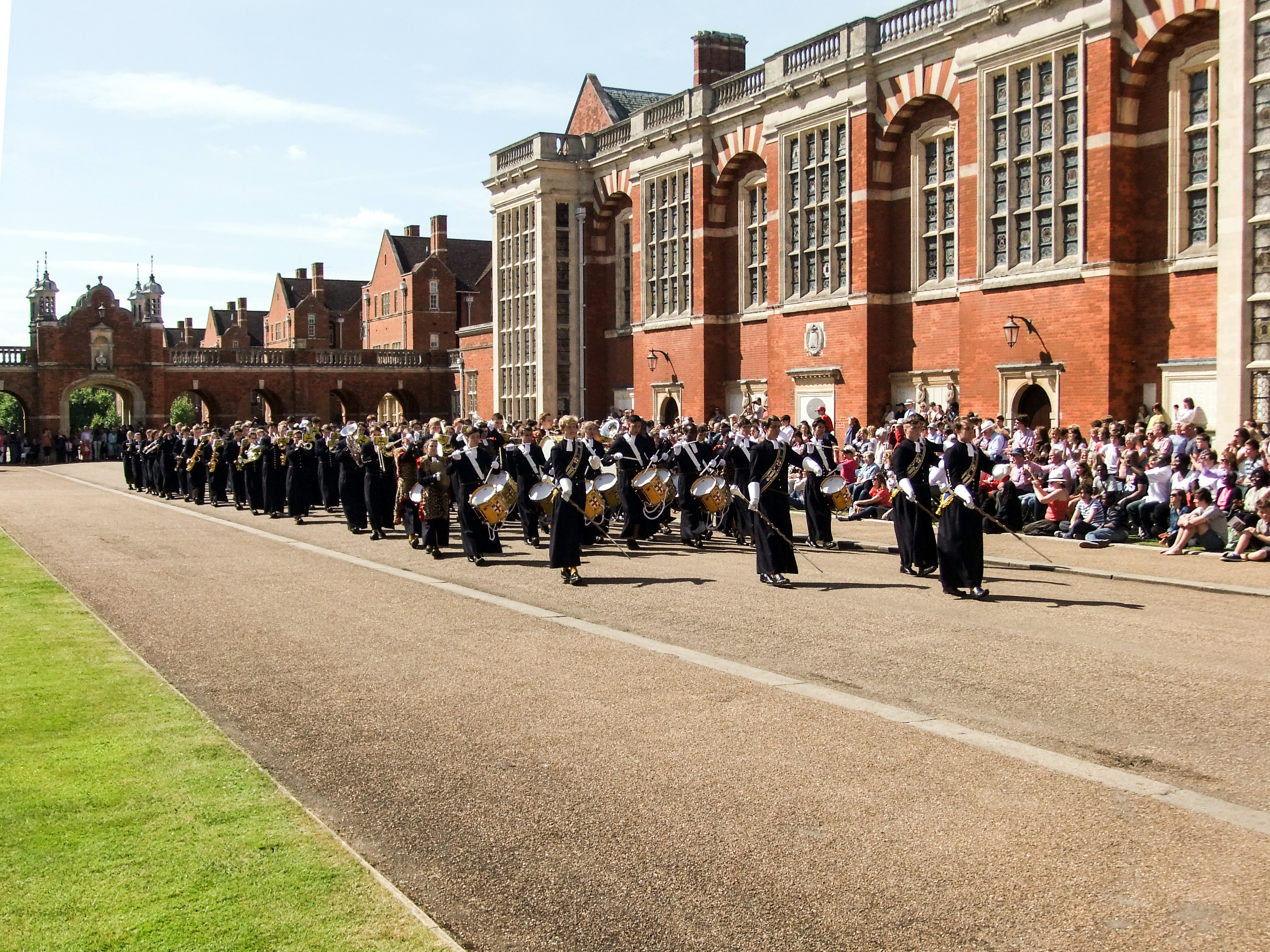
The Christ's Hospital Band march past the dining hall at the end of beating the retreat on 29 June 2013

The band generally follows the formations of the Royal Marines bands.

Christ's Hospital Band formation (marching band).

- Drum majors (who do not conduct the band but are there purely to direct marching, to place halts, step offs and for show)
- Marching percussion
  - Side drummers
  - Bass and tenor drummers
  - Cymbals
- Trombones (1st, 2nd and bass)
- Tubas and euphoniums
- French and tenor horns
- Alto saxophones (1st and 2nd)
- Tenor saxophones
- 1st and 2nd trumpets
- Bassoons
- Oboes
- Flutes (1st, 2nd and 3rd)
- Piccolos
- Clarinets (1st, 2nd and 3rd)

The band is normally formed in ranks of four for daily lunch parade and ranks of six for proper engagements.

== Engagements ==
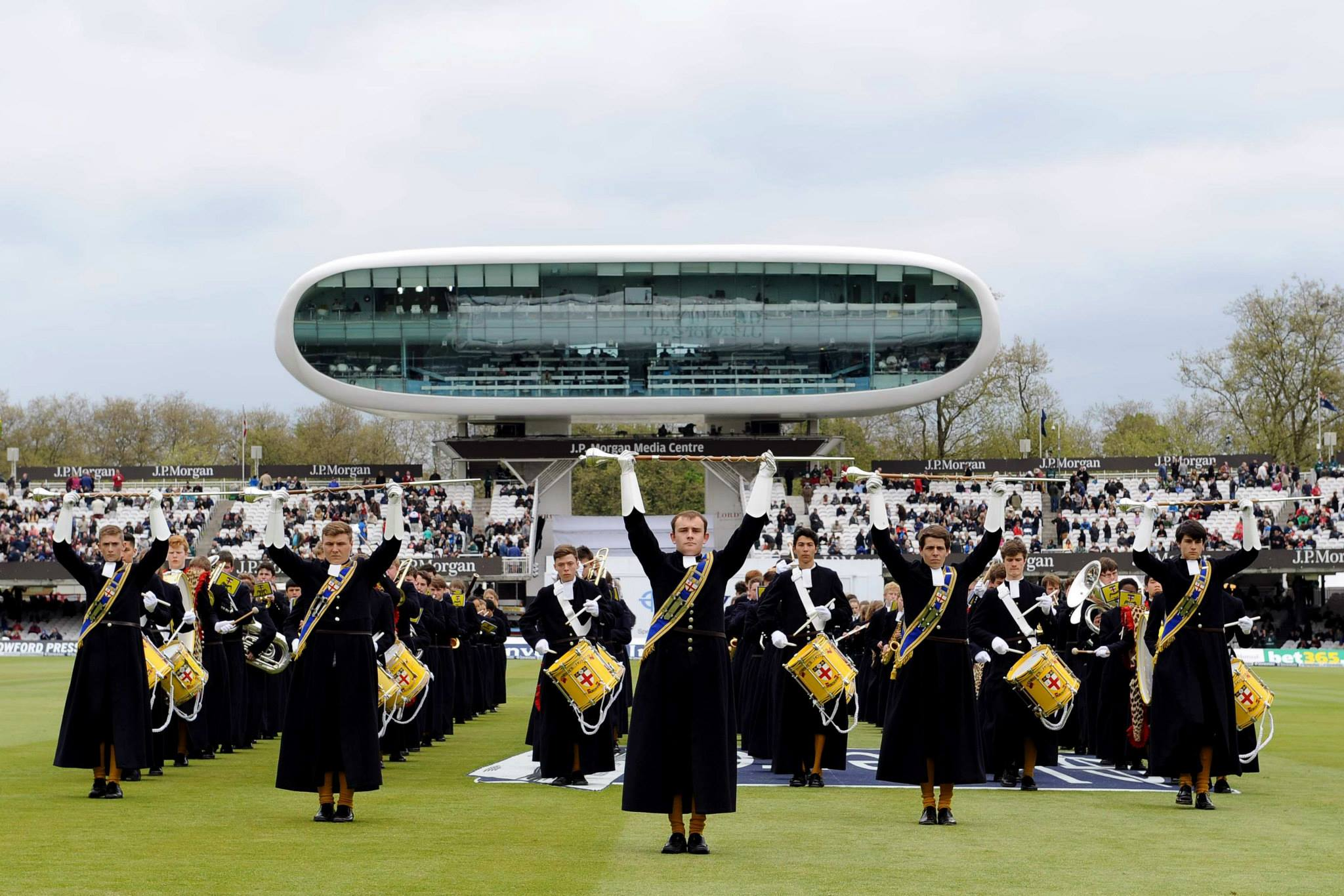
The Christ's Hospital Band performing during the lunch interval at Lord's during England vs New Zealand, 2013

The band primarily plays for the daily lunch parade, weather permitting, at the school where the whole school assembles by the Quadrangle at lunchtime and march into Dining Hall to the sound of the band. The band also plays for other events both nationally and internationally.

Within the school the band is the central attraction for open days and it also plays a vital role in any Royal visit and for the annual speech day, when the Lord Mayor of the City of London and sheriffs visit the school. The band is also called upon to provide music for the Combined Cadet Force biennial inspection in the form of both background music during the inspection and marches during the march on and march pasts. At the end of each academic year, the band puts on a marching display (known as beating retreat) in the school's main quadrangle, consisting of intricate movements in quick and slow time as well as static pieces.

Outside the school, since 1974 the band has performed in the annual Lord Mayor's Show in the City of London.

The band also has a regular engagement each summer at Lord's Cricket Ground. The band's appearances at first-class sporting events began with an invitation from Lavinia, Duchess of Norfolk to perform at Arundel Castle Cricket Ground in 1977, at the traditional match between the Duke of Norfolk's XI and that year's international touring side. The Duchess extended her invitation to the band when both she and they attended the official opening of Swan Walk Shopping Centre, Horsham in November 1976.

The band led the procession at the Queen's 80th birthday in London on 21 April 2006 and has played at Twickenham Stadium on a number of occasions.

Internationally, the band has played in the prestigious Rose Parade in California in 2002. In July 2014, the band toured Germany and Belgium where the band played, for a second time, under the Menin Gate in Ypres. They have also performed at Disneyland Paris,

Since the school relocated from the City of London to Horsham in 1902, the band have frequently appeared in the town, while also annually in the streets of London on St Matthew's Day as Christ's Hospital is the only school that is permitted to march in the city's streets.

On 12 June 2016, the Christ's Hospital Band performed at the Patron's Lunch, a celebration of the Queen’s lifetime dedicated to the patronage of more than 600 charities and organisations. The event also marked her 90th birthday.

== See also ==
- Christ's Hospital Music School
