= George Andrew Jacob =

British educator (1807–1896)

George Andrew Jacob (16 December 1807 – 7 May 1896) was an English clergyman and schoolmaster and author of many books about education and Christianity.

== Biography ==
Jacob was born at Exmouth, Devon, on 16 December 1807, where his father the Reverend Stephen Long Jacob was incumbent. His mother was Susanna, daughter of the Reverend James Bond of Ashford, Kent, England. His younger brother General John Jacob was an Indian Army Officer who created Jacob's Horse and was accorded almost mythical status in Sind Province. Jacob was headmaster of Bromsgrove Grammar School (1832–1842), a principal of the Collegiate School in Sheffield (1843–1853) and headmaster of Christ's Hospital, then in the city of London, from 1853 until his resignation from that post in 1868. In 1846, he became a member of the College of Preceptors, then a relatively new institution, President of the same 1853–1856 and Dean thereof 1859–1873. In his career, he published many educational and religious books. He died at Teignmouth, Devon, on 7 May 1896.

Jacob's great-grandson Alaric Jacob, the journalist and author, refers to him and his brother in his autobiographical novel Scenes from a Bourgeois Life.

== Bibliography ==
- 1838 – National Education on a Christian Basis (letter to Sir John Peel), London, printed in Bromsgrove.
- 1841 – The Bromsgrove Latin Grammar, 4 editions, 1841–1858.
- 1842 – The Most Ancient and Most Modern Opposition to Christian Truth compared, a sermon preached 26 December 1841, London 1842.
- 1845 – The Bromsgrove Greek Grammar, 1845.
- 1849 – Tricinium Gallicum, the first rudiments of the French language for beginners, London, 2nd edition 1857.
- 1851 – The Bromsgrove Latin Grammar (Abridged).
- 1864 – Praxis Gallica, being questions and answers on the author's Tricinium Gallicum.
- 1854 – The Sheffield-Collegiate School, an account of the school during the last 10 years, London.
- 1854 – Greek Grammar, for the use of the lower school in Christ's Hospital, London, 4 editions 1854–1871.
- 1854 – A Sermon (on Prov XXIV etc.), privately printed in London.
- 1857 – A Letter to the Reverend C Wordsworth DD (on his tract and sermon on the Divorce Bill), London.
- 1858 – The Presence of Christ, as manifested in the Gospels etc., four sermons preached before the University of Oxford, London.
- 1871 – The Ecclesiastical Polity of the New Testament, a study for the present crisis in the Church of England, London. 6 editions.
- 1872 – On Teaching the Classics: London, College of Preceptors, Lectures on Education, Volume 1, 2 editions 1872–1878.
- 1873 – The Revision of the Prayer Book, a lecture delivered in the Molesworth Hall on 29 March 1873.
- 1874 – A Friendly Reply to the seventh of Dr Harrison's tracts on the eucharistic doctrine of romantists and ritualists, London.
- 1877 – Revised English Bible (NT edition by G A Jacob & S G Green), London, printed by Eyre & Spottiswoode.
- 1878 – The Sabbath Made for Man, essay awarded an extra prize by the adjudicators of the Lord's Day Observance Society, London.
- 1883 – The Ecclesiastical Polity of the New Testament, abridged and translated into Marathi, Bombay.
- 1884 – The Lord's Supper Historically Considered, London.
- (Undated) – Perpetuity of the Sabbath law in the 4th Commandment, Sabbath Observance Society, Edinburgh.

== Unpublished books ==
- Exam Questions in Geography.
- Exam Questions in Arithmetic.
