= Robert Edwards (cricketer) =

English cricketer and clergyman

Personal information
- Full name: Robert Stafford Edwards
- Born: 19 September 1828; Chatham, Kent, England
- Died: 29 March 1899 (aged 70); Watford, Hertfordshire, England
- Batting: Unknown

Domestic team information
- Years: Team
- 1849–1850: Cambridge University

Career statistics
Competition	First-class
Matches	4
Runs scored	106
Batting average	17.66
100s/50s	–/1
Top score	66*
Catches/stumpings	3/–
- Source: Cricinfo, 23 April 2021

Robert Stafford Edwards (19 September 1828 – 29 March 1899) was an English first-class cricketer and clergyman.

The son of Joseph Holbeach Edwards, he was born at Chatham in September 1828. He was educated at Christ's Hospital, before going up to St John's College, Cambridge. He played first-class cricket for Cambridge University Cricket Club while studying at Cambridge, making two appearances each in 1849 and 1850, playing twice against the Marylebone Cricket Club and once against Cambridge Town Club and Oxford University in The University Match, an appearance which gained him a cricket blue. He scored 106 runs in his four matches, with a highest score of 66 not out.

After graduating from Cambridge, he took holy orders at Chester in 1857. He was a chaplain to the Chester Diocesan Training College from 1857 to 1858. He was curate at Great Packington in Warwickshire from 1858 to 1860. He spent the next two years as curate at Dudley, before becoming curate at Kingswinford in Staffordshire bewtwen 1862 and 1865. Remaining in Staffordshire, he was curate at Kinver from 1865 to 1869, before becoming curate at Enville from 1869 to 1873. From 1873 until his death at Watford in March 1899, he was a member of the clergy at Canterbury Cathedral.
