= Henry Ralph Lumley =

British pilot (1892–1918)

- Born: 20 March 1892; Marylebone, London, England
- Died: 11 March 1918 (aged 25); Bromley, England
- Military career
- Allegiance: United Kingdom
- Branch: Royal Flying Corps
- Service years: –
- Rank: Second Lieutenant

Second Lieutenant Henry Ralph Lumley (20 March 1892 – 11 March 1918) was a First World War pilot and burn victim whose case was important to the future development of facial reconstruction and plastic surgery.

== Early life ==
Henry Ralph Lumley was the son of Robert and Florence (née Fiske) Lumley, his father was a barrister and dramatic author and his mother an actress. Henry attended Christ's Hospital school, Horsham from 1902 to 1908. He became an employee of the Eastern Telegraph Company. At the start of the war he was commissioned as an officer in the Royal Flying Corps and went to the Central Flying School for pilot training.

== Accident ==
As he graduated from the Central Flying School the aircraft he was flying crashed. Lumley was badly burned, losing his lips, eyebrows, and most of the skin on his face. His left eye was burned out, and his right eye was mostly blind.

== Surgery ==
Lumley was transferred to Sidcup on 22 September 1917, for reconstructive surgery. The surgical team, led by Harold Gillies, decided to reconstruct Henry's face using a huge skin graft from his chest. The scar tissue would be removed, and the graft would be stitched into place. Tubed pedicles would be employed to provide further available skin. A similar, though less drastic, procedure had already been successfully carried out on a sailor, William Vicarage, who had received severe cordite burns at the Battle of Jutland.

The operation was performed in stages. The first, on 24 October 1917, outlined the chest graft and created the tubed pedicles at the neck. The second, more major, operation occurred on 15 February 1918. The scar tissue was excised, effectively removing all traces of Lumley's 'old' face, and the graft was stitched into place.

Because of the size of the graft and Lumley's already weakened state, the chest skin was rejected and he died of heart failure on 11 March 1918.

== Legacy ==
After Lumley's death Gillies realised that he had tried to do too much too quickly, and that large facial grafts were more hazardous than expected. As a result, he began using smaller staged grafts to create the overall result instead of a single large graft.

The lessons learned from the failure of Henry Ralph Lumley's surgery would go on to help thousands of people suffering with extreme facial burns.
