= Adrian Bawtree =

British composer (born 1968)

Adrian Bawtree (born 1968) is an English composer and organist who served as Director of Music and Organist at Rochester Cathedral from 2022 to 2026.

== Education and family ==
Bawtree was educated at Christ's Hospital before attending the University of Oxford and was an organ scholar at St Bride's Church, Fleet Street, in London. He later studied at Worcester College, Oxford, under David Sanger, and won a silver medal from the Worshipful Company of Musicians for achieving the highest score in the Royal College of Organists exam. He took a postgraduate degree in orchestral conducting at the Royal College of Music.

Bawtree is married to Victoria Rowcroft, Head of Academic Music at St Edmunds School in Canterbury, with whom he has two sons, Matthew and Theo.

== Career ==
Bawtree initially worked as an organist in several churches in England, and is currently the musical director of Cantores Dominicae and the Canterbury Singers and the conductor of the Weald Choir of Crawley. He worked part-time at Christ's Hospital as the chapel organist and as an assistant housemaster before succeeding Bruce Grindlay as Director of Music at the school when Grindlay became headmaster of Sutton Valence School.

In April 2014, Bawtree was appointed Assistant Sub-Organist of Rochester Cathedral, with responsibility for playing services at weekends and major festivals. In September 2015, he was appointed Second Assistant Organist at Canterbury Cathedral.

From 2022 6o 2026 he served as Director of Music and Organist at Rochester Cathedral.

In September 2024 he was appointed Director of Music of Rochester Choral Society, established in 1873.

Bawtree occasionally conducts orchestras as well as choirs. He has composed a work inspired by the Battle of Trafalgar and Admiral Nelson called England Expects, as well as a piece called Footsteps along the Road. He has toured the Czech Republic, Hungary and the United States, and has also worked with the BBC Singers.

Academic offices
Preceded by Bruce Grindlay	Director of Music at Christ's Hospital; 2009−2011	Succeeded by Andrew Cleary

Cultural offices
Preceded by Francesca Massey	Organist and Master of the Choristers of Rochester Cathedral; 2022−2026	Succeeded by vacant
