= Harpocration =

2nd-century AD Alexandrian Greek grammarian

Valerius Harpocration (Ancient Greek: Οὐαλέριος or Βαλέριος Ἁρποκρατίων, gen. Ἁρποκρατίωνος) was a Greek grammarian of Alexandria, probably working in the 2nd century AD. He is possibly the Harpocration mentioned by Julius Capitolinus (Life of Verus, 2) as the Greek tutor of Lucius Verus (2nd century AD); some authorities place him much later, on the ground that he borrowed from Athenaeus.

Harpocration's Lexicon of the Ten Orators (Περὶ τῶν Λέξεων τῶν Δέκα Ῥητόρων, or briefly Λεξικὸν τῶν Δέκα Ῥητόρων), which has come down to us in an incomplete form, contains, in more or less alphabetical order, notes on well-known events and persons mentioned by the orators, and explanations of legal and commercial expressions. As nearly all the lexicons to the Greek orators have been lost, Harpocration's work is especially valuable. Amongst his authorities were the writers of Atthides (histories of Attica), the grammarian Didymus Chalcenterus, Dionysius of Halicarnassus, and the lexicographer Dionysius, son of Tryphon. The book also contains contributions to the history of Attic oratory and Greek literature generally.

The Collection of Florid Expressions, a sort of anthology or chrestomathy attributed to him by the Suda, is lost, but elements of it survive in later lexica. A series of articles in the margin of a Cambridge manuscript of the Lexicon forms the basis of the Lexicon rhetoricum Cantabrigiense by Peter Paul Dobree.

== Editions ==
- Immanuel Bekker (1833)
- W. Dindorf (1853)
- Georg Kalkoff, De cod. epitomes Harpocrationeae (1886)
- John J. Keaney, Harpocration: Lexeis of the Ten Orators (1991)
