= James Scholefield =

English classical scholar (1789–1853)

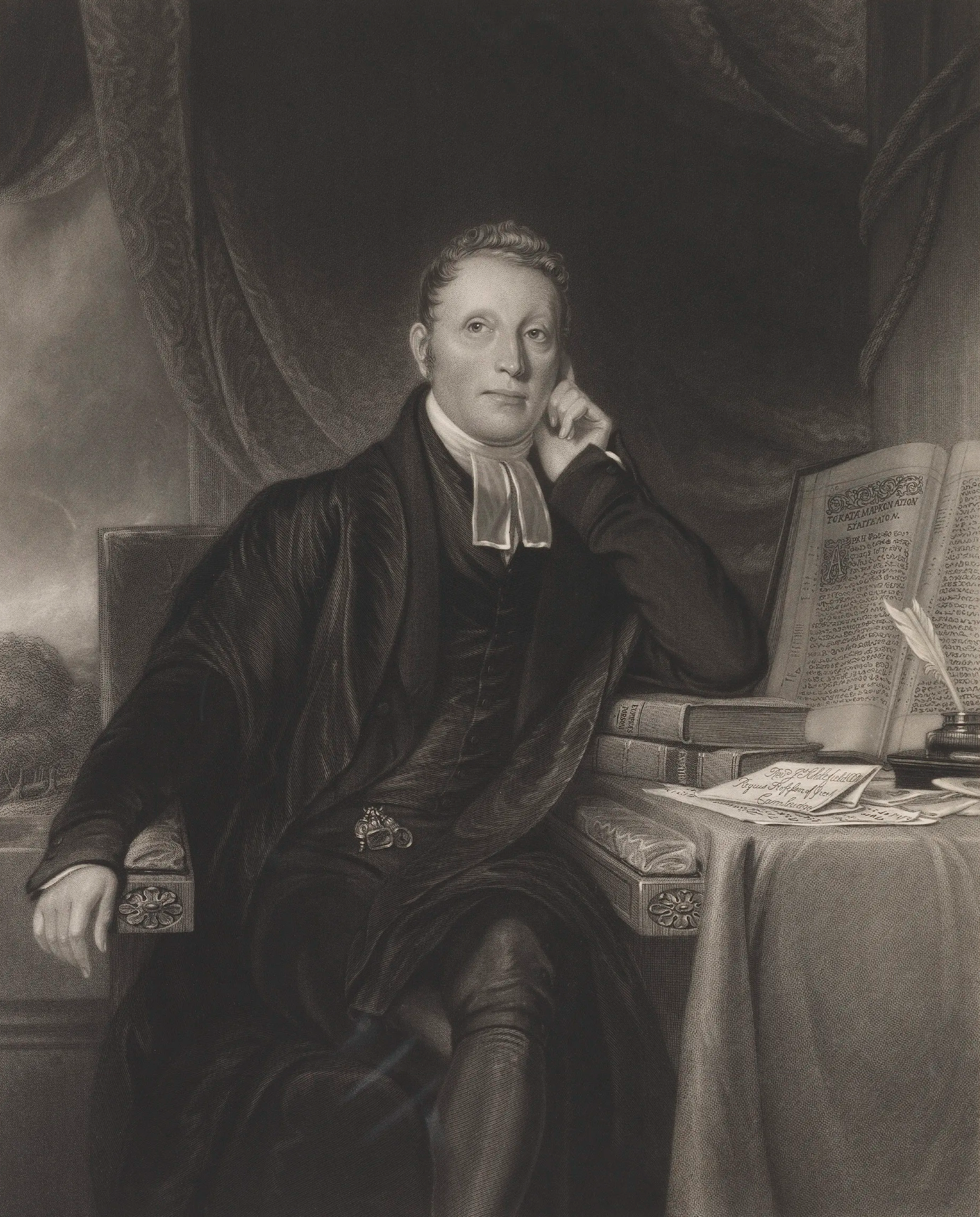
Mezzotint of Scholefield, c. 1855

James Scholefield (15 November 1789 – 4 April 1853) was an English classical scholar.

== Life and career ==
James Scholefield was born at Henley-on-Thames on 15 November 1789. He was educated at Christ's Hospital and Trinity College, Cambridge, and was in 1825 appointed professor of Greek in the university. He was for some time curate to Charles Simeon, the evangelical churchman, and his low church views involved him in disputes with his own parishioners at St Michael's, Cambridge, of which he was perpetual curate from 1823 till his death at Hastings on 4 April 1853. From 1849 until his death he was canon of Ely.

Scholefield was an excellent teacher. His most useful work was his edition of the Adversaria of PP Dobree, his predecessor in the chair of Greek. He also published editions of Aeschylus (1828), in which he dealt very conservatively with the text, and of Porson's four plays of Euripides. His Hints for an improved Translation of the New Testament met with considerable success. He was one of the examiners in the first Classical Tripos (1824). The Scholefield Theological Prize at Cambridge was established in commemoration of him in 1856.

== Other works ==
- The Greek and English Testament (1879)
- Hints for an Improved Translation in the Authorised Version of the New Testament (1857)
