= Samuel Cobb (poet) =

British poet (died 1713)

Samuel Cobb (baptized 1675–1713) was an English poet, critic and school master who was known for a light hearted, ironic pose in his verse and a witty, good natured personal life.

== Life ==
He was born in London and orphaned early in his life. He attended Christ's Hospital under the Lord Mayor's charity and continued with indigent aid to Trinity College, Cambridge for his B.A. in 1698 and M.A. in 1702. Upon graduation with the master's degree, he began teaching at his old school, Christ's Hospital, where he would continue until his death.

Cobb was a classicist and a teacher of grammar at Christ's Hospital, and his poetry shows his knowledge of ancient Greek. His first publication was in 1694, with A Pindarique Ode . . . in Memory of Queen Mary. The next year, he published Bersaba, and in 1697 he wrote Pax redux. He wrote several other odes and poems celebrating royal occasions, evidently with an eye toward gaining sufficient funds to relieve his poverty. This was a habit he would continue with 1709's The Female Reign (on the accession of Anne). His most famous poem was Poetae Britannici in 1700, which was a survey of previous English poetry in a light style, clear diction, and imagery that later critics like John Nichols considered "sublime."

Cobb was also interested in earthy humor. In 1707, he wrote Discourse on Criticism and the Liberty of Writing and argued for the virtue and freedom of the author against too nice a critique. He wrote Mouse-Trap in 1708, and Cobb translated Chaucer's The Miller's Tale in 1712. Cobb's translation was extremely popular, and it colored the eighteenth century's understanding of Chaucer. He also worked with John Ozell and Nicholas Rowe to translate The Works of Lucian in 1710–1711.

Cobb's cause of death is unknown. He was buried in the cloisters of his school.
