= James Boyer =

- Born: 1736; London, England
- Died: 1814 (aged 77–78); London, England
- Education: Balliol College, Oxford
- Occupations: Clergyman, educator

The Reverend James Boyer (1736–1814) was the tyrannical headmaster of Christ's Hospital from 1776 to 1799.

He was educated at Christ's Hospital, which he entered in 1744, and at Balliol College, Oxford, matriculating in 1752, graduating BA in 1756.

== Reputation ==
These years at the end of the 18th century were when three of the school's most famous students attended: Leigh Hunt, Charles Lamb, and Samuel Taylor Coleridge. Boyer's personality was immortalized in the writing of all three authors. Hunt made several references to Boyer in his autobiography, Lamb wrote of him in his two essays concerning his time at Christ's Hospital, and Coleridge referred to him in his Biographia Literaria. Through the work of these three authors in particular Boyer gained a reputation for capricious and unpredictable brutality. Most famously, Boyer knocked one of Hunt's teeth out by throwing a heavy copy of Homer at his head from across the room.

Lamb wrote this about the arbitrary violence of Boyer:

"I have known him double his knotty fist at a poor trembling child (the maternal milk hardly dry upon its lips) with a 'Sirrah, do you presume to set your wits at me?' – Nothing was more common than to see him make a head-long entry into the school-room, from his inner recess, or library, and, with turbulent eye, singling out a lad, roar out, 'Od's my life, Sirrah,' (his favourite adjuration) 'I have a great mind to whip you,' – then, with as sudden a retracting impulse, fling back into his lair – and, after a cooling lapse of some minutes (during which all but the culprit had totally forgotten the context) as if it had been some Devil's Litany, with the expletory yell – 'and I WILL too,'"

The arbitrary nature of Boyer's tyranny is illustrated in a story Hunt tells of a boy referred to simply as C__ with whom the master took "every opportunity to be severe with him, nobody knew why."

"One day he [Boyer] comes into the school, and finds him placed in the middle of it with three other boys. He was not in one of his worst humours, and did not seem inclined to punish them till he saw his antagonist. 'Oh, oh! sir,' said he: 'what! you are among them are you?' and gave him an exclusive thump on the face. He then turned to one of the Grecians, and said, 'I have not time to flog all these boys; make them draw lots, and I'll punish one,' The lots were drawn, and C__'s was favourable. 'Oh, oh!' returned the master, when he saw them, 'you have escaped have you, sir?' and pulling out his watch, and turning again to the Grecian, observed, that he found he had time to punish the whole three: 'and, sir,' added he to C__, with another slap, 'I'll begin with you.' He then took the boy into the library and flogged him; and on issuing forth again, had the face to say, with an air of indifference, 'I have not time, to punish these two other boys; let them take care how they provoke me another time."

Boyer is also credited with much of the achievement of the students at the school. Coleridge, in particular, praised Boyer's influence concerning his approach to poetics.

“I learned from him that poetry, even that of the loftiest and, seemingly, that of the wildest odes, had a logic of its own, as severe as that of science; and more difficult, because more subtle, more complex, and dependent on more fugitive causes. In the truly great poets, he would say, there is a reason assignable, not only to every word, but for the position of every word; and I well remember that, availing himself of the synonymes to the Homer of Didymus, he made us attempt to show, with regard to each, why it would not have been conveyed with equal force and dignity in plainer words.”

According to Hunt, when Coleridge learned that Boyer was on his death-bed, he said “it was lucky that the cherubim who took him to heaven were nothing but faces and wings, or he would infallibly have flogged them by the way.”

== Sources ==
- Autobiography by Leigh Hunt, 2 volumes, E.P. Dutton & Company, New York, 1903.
- Biogrphia Literaria by Samuel Coleridge, Harper and Brothers, New York, 1884
- Everybody's Lamb by Charles Lamb, (A.C. Ward [ed.])G. Bell & Sons, London, 1933.
