= Christ's Hospital =

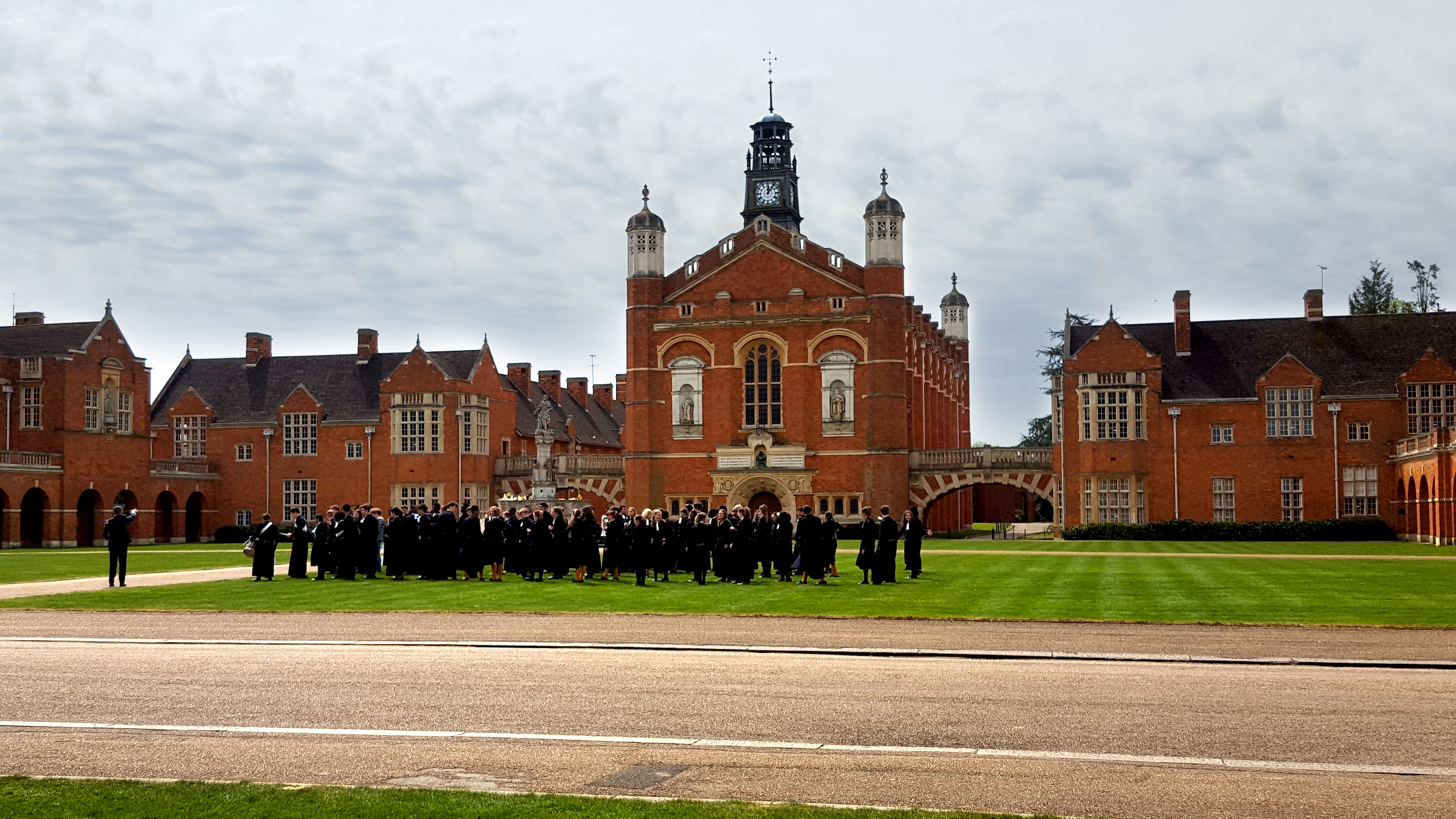

Location
- Horsham, West Sussex, RH13 0YP; England; 51°02′39″N 0°21′47″W

Information
- Type: Public school Private boarding school
- Motto: Latin: Omnes homines honorate, Fraternitatem amate, Deum timete, Regem honorate (Honour All Men, Love the Brotherhood, Fear God, Honour the King)
- Religious affiliation: Church of England
- Established: 1552; 474 years ago
- Founder: Edward VI
- Department for Education URN: 126107 Tables
- President: The Duke of Gloucester
- Chair of the Council: Miriam McKay
- Head: Matthew Judd
- Gender: Co-educational
- Age: 11 to 18
- Enrolment: 900 (2017)
- Houses: Peele, Thornton, Middleton, Coleridge, Lamb, Barnes, Maine, Leigh Hunt
- Colours: Blue & Yellow
- Publication: Housey! The Blue; The Broadie
- Alumni: Old Blues
- Patron: Charles III
- School Song: Votum; The Foundation Hymn; The Hertford Grace
- Website: http://www.christs-hospital.org.uk/

Christ's Hospital is a public school (English fee-charging boarding school for pupils aged 11–18) with a royal charter, located to the south of Horsham in West Sussex.

The school was founded in 1552 and the royal charter granted in 1553 (26 June, 7 Edw. VI). Since its establishment, Christ's Hospital has been a charity school, with a core aim to offer children from disadvantaged backgrounds the chance of a better education.

== Charitable foundation ==
Christ's Hospital is unusual among British independent schools in that the majority of the students receive bursaries. This stems from its founding charter as a charitable school. School fees are paid on a means-tested basis, with substantial subsidies paid by the school or their benefactors, so that pupils from all walks of life are able to have private education that would otherwise be beyond their means.

The trustees of the foundation are the Council of Almoners, chaired by the Treasurer of Christ's Hospital, who govern the foundation according to a Scheme of Administration granted by the Charity Commission. The historic Court of Governors survives as a formal institution consisting of over 650 benefactors but its powers have since the 19th century been largely transferred to the smaller Council of Almoners.

In 2007, Christ's Hospital was formally separated into two related registered charities: Christ's Hospital Foundation and Christ's Hospital School.

== History ==
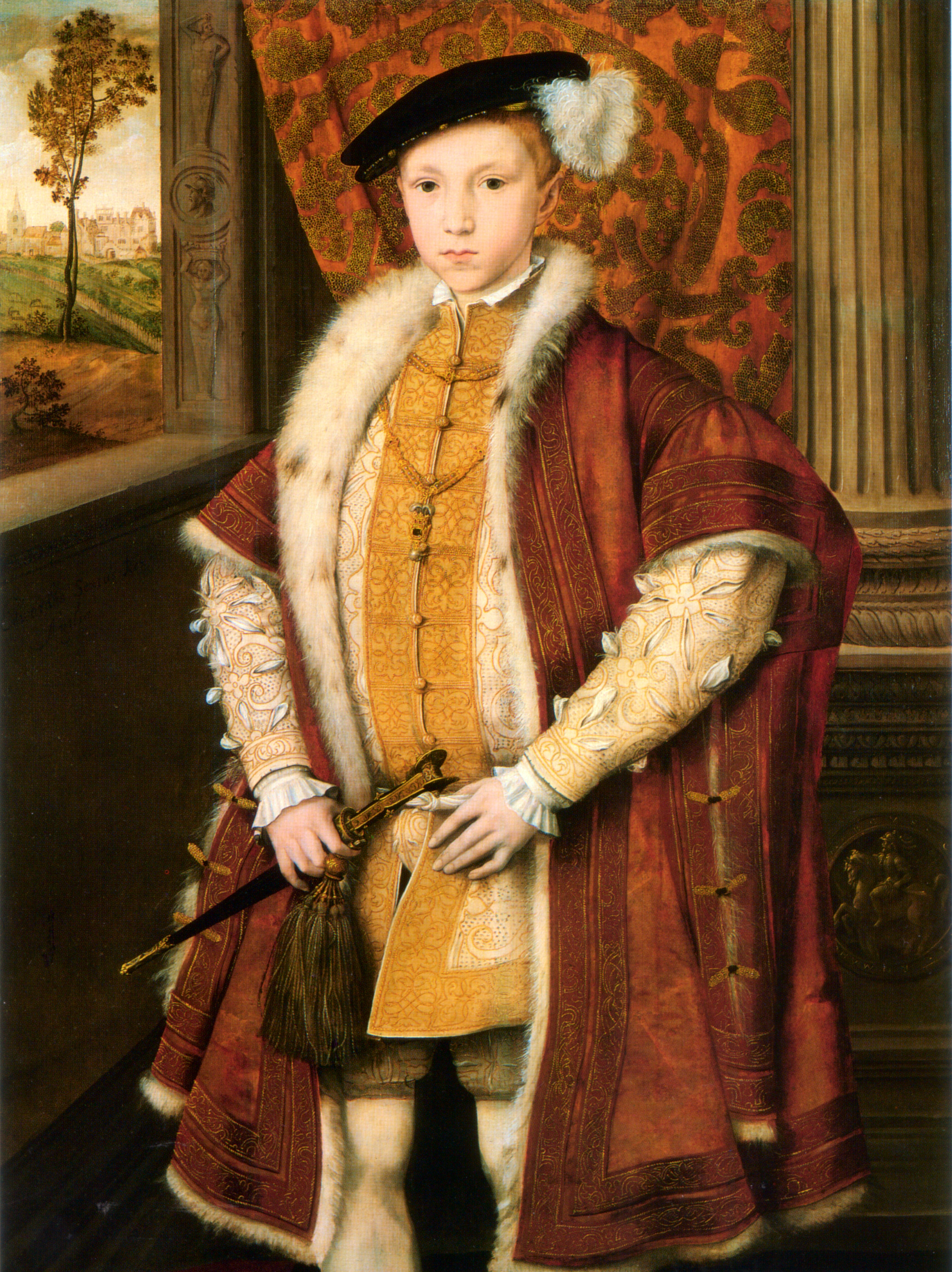
The boy-king Edward VI, founder of Christ's Hospital

Christ's Hospital was the result of the foundation by Henry VIII and confirmed by Edward VI, assisted by Nicholas Ridley, Bishop of London, and Sir Richard Dobbs, Lord Mayor of London. Its genesis was the earlier dissolution of the monasteries and the resultant overflow onto the streets of the poor and destitute. Encouraged by a sermon from Ridley, exhorting mercy to the poor, the king wrote to the Lord Mayor encouraging him to action. This he did via a committee of 30 merchants.

Henry VIII had already granted the use of Greyfriars to the city for the relief of the poor and to house the homeless children which the magistrates had taken notice of. In 1553 (26 June, 7 Edw. VI) Edward granted Bridewell Palace, his lands at the Savoy, and rents and other chattels to create three Royal Hospitals – Christ's Hospital, Bridewell Hospital (now the King Edward's School, Witley, Surrey) and St Thomas' Hospital. The three institutions use the same coat of arms, although slightly modified by the latter.

The first boys and girls entered the school in Newgate in 1552. The royal charter was granted and signed by its founder, Edward VI, the following year. The first treasurer was Richard Grafton. The Protestant foundation survived the Marian period and in the 1560s it sent its first scholars to Oxford and Cambridge.

The school occupied Newgate as its major site for 350 years, but from time to time children were housed in other parts of the country. 32 children perished during the Great Plague of 1665. In the following year the Great Fire of London destroyed much of the hospital, except four cloisters and three wards, but there were no casualties among the children. Around 200 pupils were sent to Islington and Clerkenwell and then to Ware and Hertford.

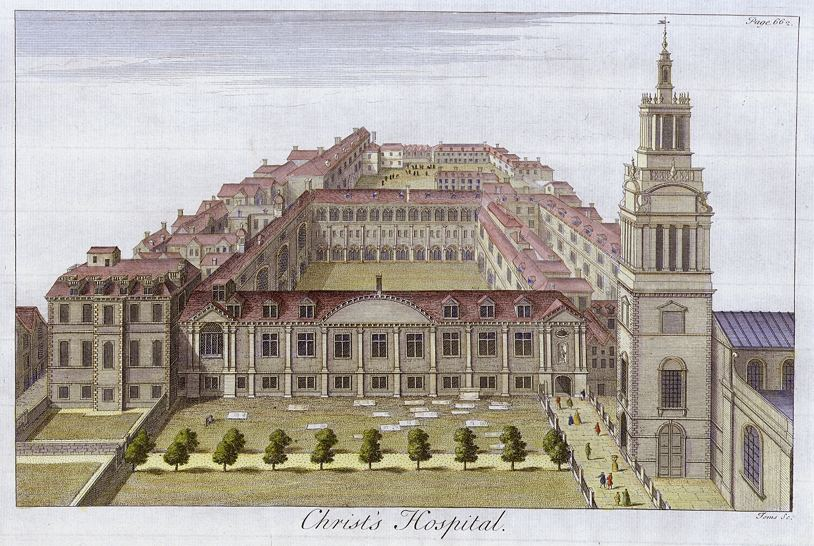
Christ's Hospital's buildings in London in 1770, with the tower of Christ Church Greyfriars at right. The nave of the church was destroyed by German bombing.

By the end of the 17th century the buildings had been rebuilt with the assistance of Sir Christopher Wren, a governor of Christ's Hospital, and Nicholas Hawksmoor, who designed the Writing School (1696). The church of Christ Church, Newgate Street, designed by Wren, replaced the damaged choir of the former Greyfriars' church and served as a place of worship for the children of Christ's Hospital in the city until the move to Horsham. Through the will of the royal jeweller, George Heriot, it also became the inspiration for the foundation of George Heriot's Hospital in Edinburgh, which was the first of the "Hospital Schools" to be founded in Scotland.

Christ's Hospital was given its second royal charter by Charles II in 1673. This created the Royal Mathematical School, the original purpose of which was to train mathematicians and navigators who would serve as naval officers and merchant seafarers. Samuel Pepys, Secretary to His Majesty's Navy and from 1699 vice-president of Christ's Hospital, made a considerable contribution to Christ's Hospital. Isaac Newton, Jonas Moore, John Flamsteed, and Edmund Halley contributed to plans for the course of study of the new school within the foundation.

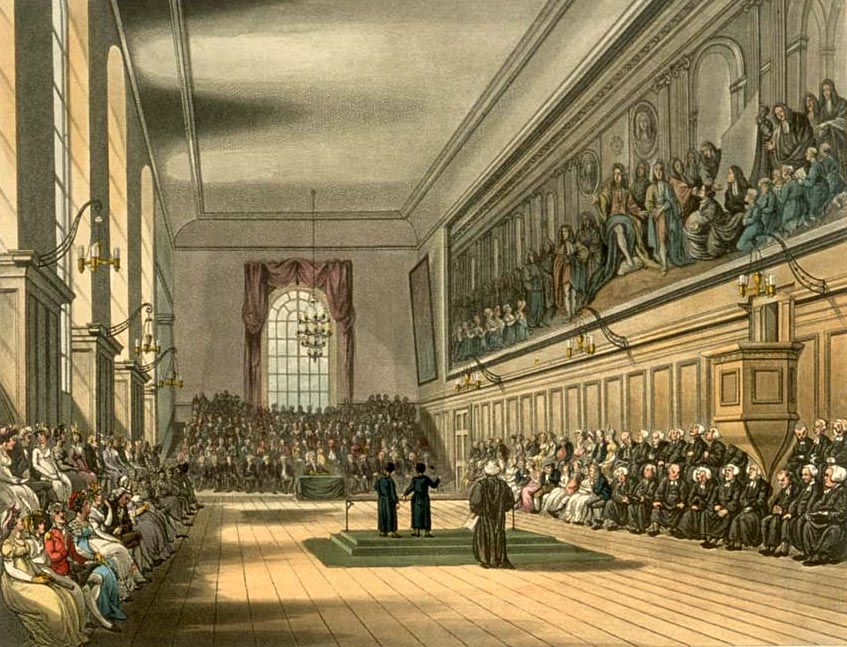
Engraving in The Microcosm of London (1808) of the Great Hall on St Matthew's Day, 21 September. Two Grecians destined for scholarships to Oxford and Cambridge universities give orations in praise of the school in Latin and English. The Verrio painting is on the wall on the right.

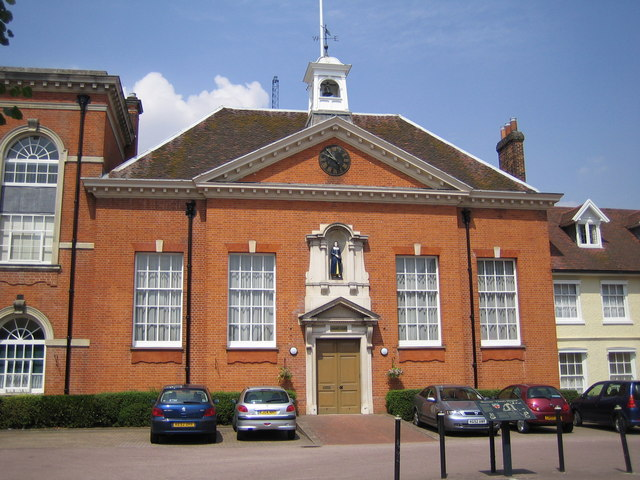
The former Christ's Hospital in Hertford

The girls of the hospital settled at Hertford from 1707. The governors had been paying a teacher in Hertford from 1653, and the removal of some children from London following the Great Fire strengthened the link with the town. In 1761, 200 boys under the age of ten along with the boys from Ware were relocated to Hertford. In 1778 the last girls were moved out of London to join the others at Hertford, where the school was rebuilt 1795–1798 to provide accommodation for the new numbers.

Christ's Hospital's most famous upper master was James Boyer who presided from 1778 to 1799 and instructed James Leigh Hunt, Charles Lamb, and Samuel Taylor Coleridge.

In November 1815, the "most infamous Regency flagellant”, an MP named Sir Eyre Coote, entered Christ's Hospital mathematical school, sent away the younger boys and paid the older ones for a session of mutual flogging. The school nurse arrived to find him buttoning his breeches; England's satirical press had come of age in time to make the very most of such a moment. Coote endured a cartoon by George Cruikshank, a vaunted caricaturist, and national humiliation.

The notable London architects, John Shaw Senior and John Shaw Junior, were architects and surveyors to Christ's Hospital throughout the first half of the 1800s. The Shaws' work included the old school hall (c.1825).

The Duke of Cambridge started a tradition of Royal Presidents in 1854.

A commission of inquiry in 1837 proposed reforms, and in 1864 the Taunton Commission investigated the endowed schools. As a result of this a greater number of girls were admitted. However, in the 1890s boys still outnumbered girls at Hertford.

Another commission in 1877 proposed a new site for the school, where all the boys would be taught. This proposal was questioned by some of the governors. The Duke of Cambridge said:

I am one of those who are perfectly prepared to go with the spirit of the age in which we live, but I confess that I am also one of those who do not love change for change’s sake. To upset an old and long standing institution... is a very dangerous experiment to try.

However, the proposal was carried out. 1,200 acres (4.9 km^{2}) of land outside Horsham in Sussex was purchased from the Aylesbury Dairy Company for £47,500. The foundation stone was laid by Edward, Prince of Wales on 23 October 1897, on behalf of the sovereign, the date being the anniversary of the birthday of the founder. The new school was designed by architect Aston Webb, with fireplaces by Leonard Shuffrey. Historic architectural features from the old school buildings (the Grecians' Arch and the Wren Arch) were salvaged and incorporated in the new buildings.

The boys were relocated from Newgate and Hertford to the new site in 1902. Hertford became a girls-only school, until the girls joined the boys on the Horsham site in 1985.

Over the centuries Christ's Hospital has continued to enjoy royal patronage. In 1919, George V became the first royal patron, followed by George VI in 1937 and Elizabeth II in 1953.

Sexual abuse of pupils from 1969 to 2001 led to six former teachers being convicted of offences after more than 20 former students made complaints to the police in 2016. The convicted former teachers were sentenced to prison terms of up to 17 years.

== Architecture ==
The ensemble of buildings in the Christ's Hospital Horsham campus were Grade II* listed in 1959. The complex includes a tall water tower, a dining hall facing a quadrangle flanked by collannaded wings, and a school chapel.

The red brick colonnades are joined to the dining hall with stone archways which were designed by John Shaw in 1836 for the old school in Newgate Street in the City of London. These archways were dismantled and re-erected here at the Horsham site in 1902.

The Big School is noted for its large Perpendicular-style windows, its octagonal turrets and a square clock tower on the roof. Another remnant of the Newgate Street school is to be found at the south end of the Big School, the portico designed by Sir Christopher Wren.

The dining hall is dominated by an 86-foot (26 m)-long painting by Antonio Verrio which depicts the foundation of the Royal Mathematical School at Christ's by King Charles II in 1673. The canvas contains over 100 figures, including Charles II, and King James II was added at a later date. The painting had previously hung in the former Great Halls in London for over 320 years.

The school chapel was designed by Aston Webb and E Bell. The Bath stone reredos at the east end depicts Christ in Glory surrounded by sculptures of the Twelve Apostles, and in the lower panel is Christ receiving the children. The Apostles were designed by William Silver Frith, with the central panel by William Bateman Fagan and Bell, and carved by stonemasons Daymond & Son. Another work by Frith is the statue of the Good Shepherd in a niche above the chapel door, which was installed as a war memorial in memory of Old Blues who died in World War I.

The altar, by Norman & Burt of Burgess Hill, is in mahogany inlaid with holly ornamentation. The stained-glass window is by Thomas Ralph Spence and the pipe organ was built by Alfred Kirkland.

The walls of the chapel nave are adorned with a series of sixteen murals, painted by Frank Brangwyn in tempera in 1912-23. The murals illustrate scenes from the early Christian Church, including depictions of the martyrdom of St Alban, St Columba landing at Iona, St Ambrose training his choir, and St Paul.

Architectural highlights

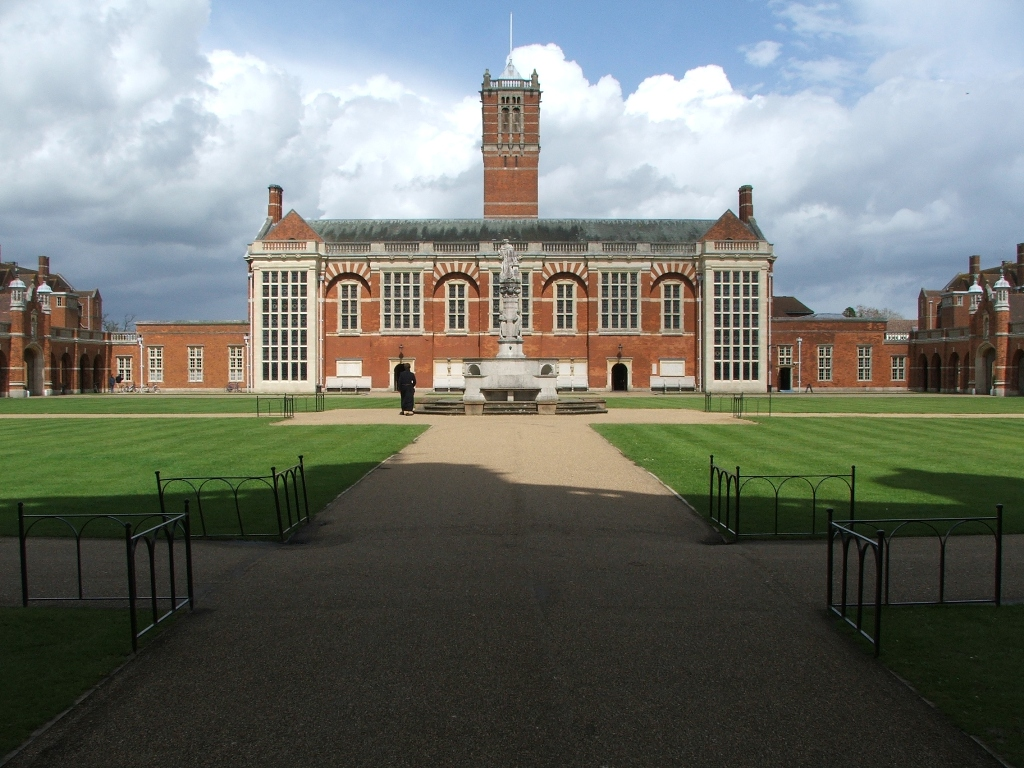
The dining hall and the quad, seen from Big School

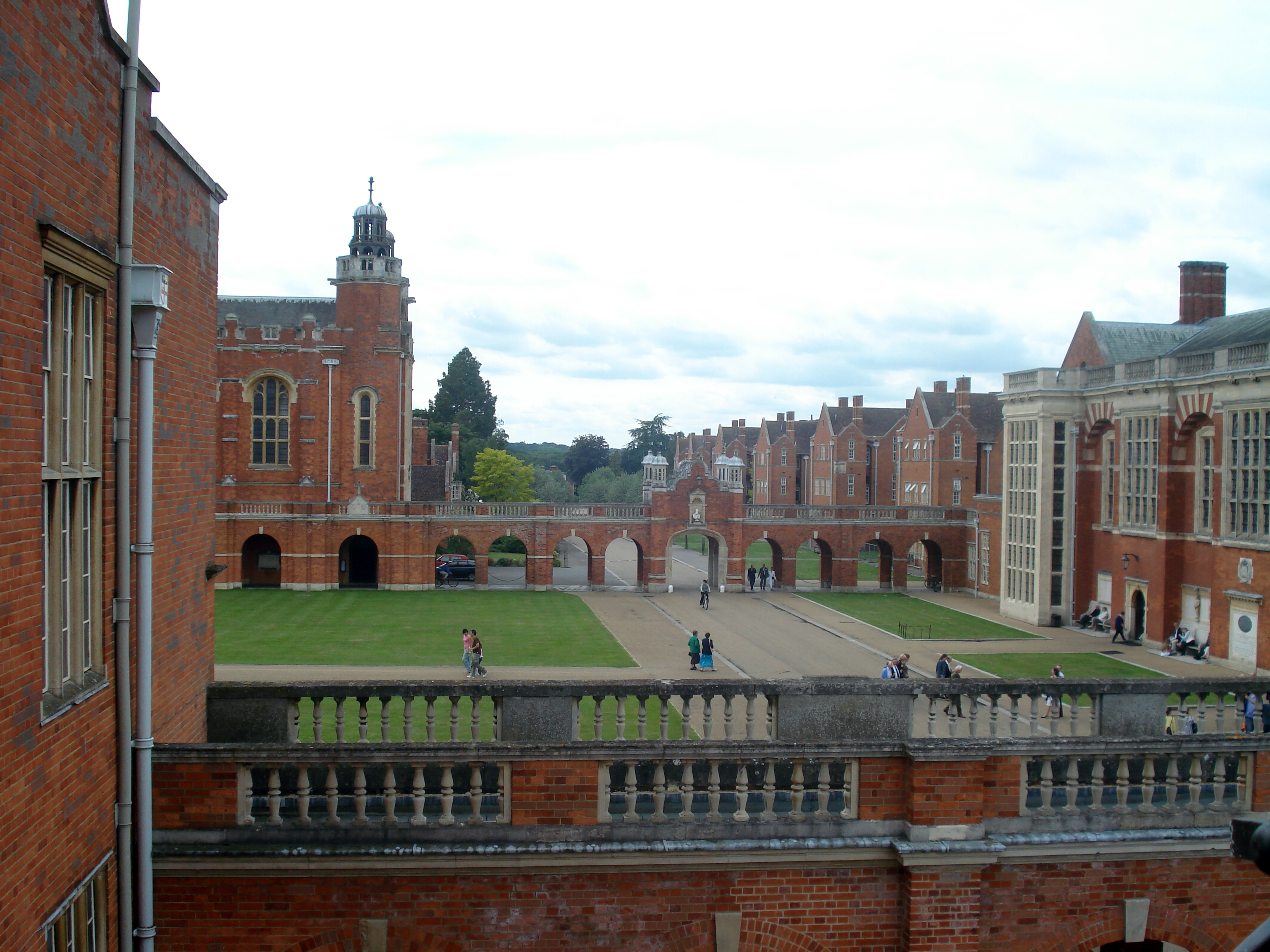
The quad and Front Avenue, seen from the Art School

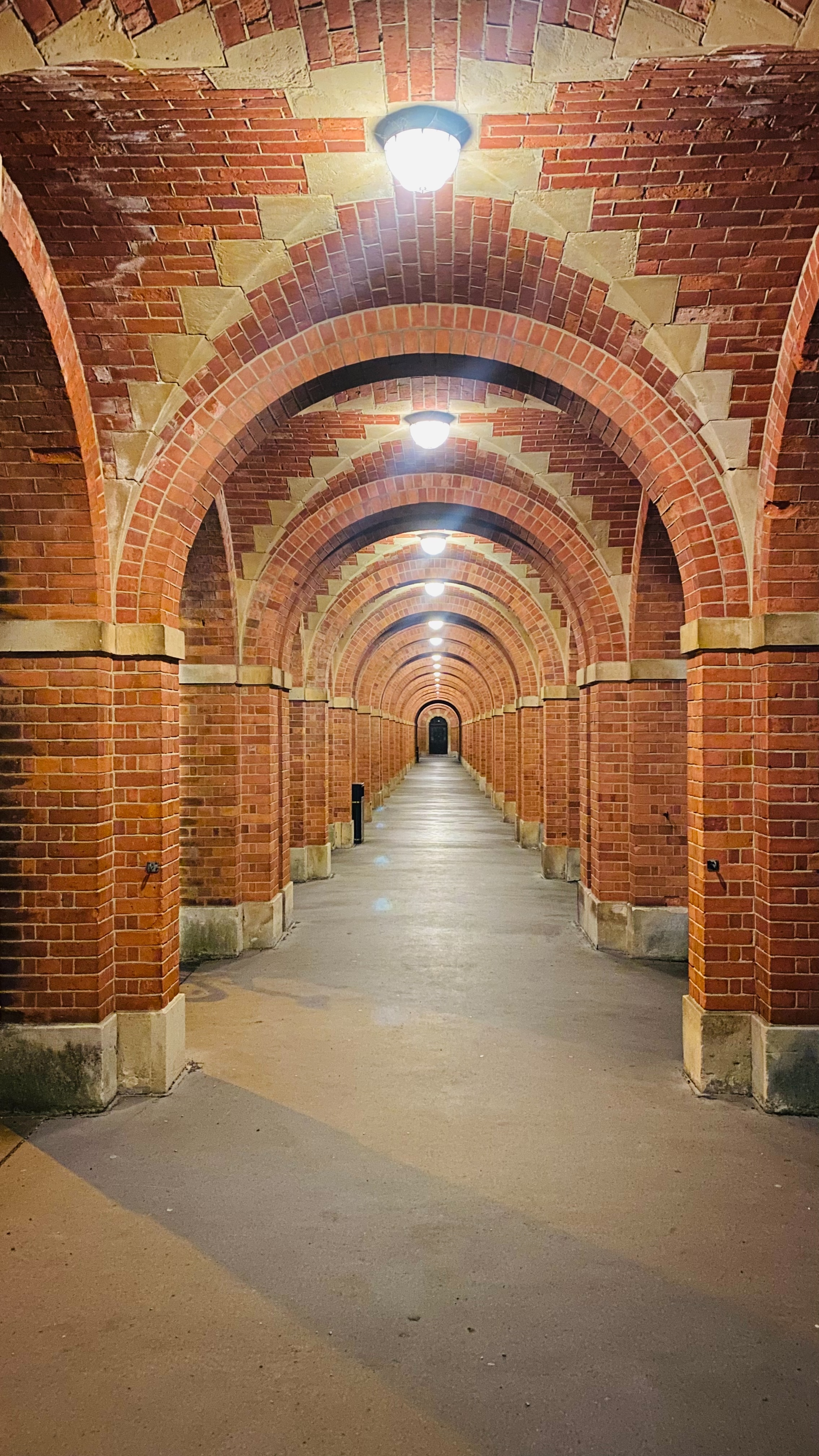
The quad cloister

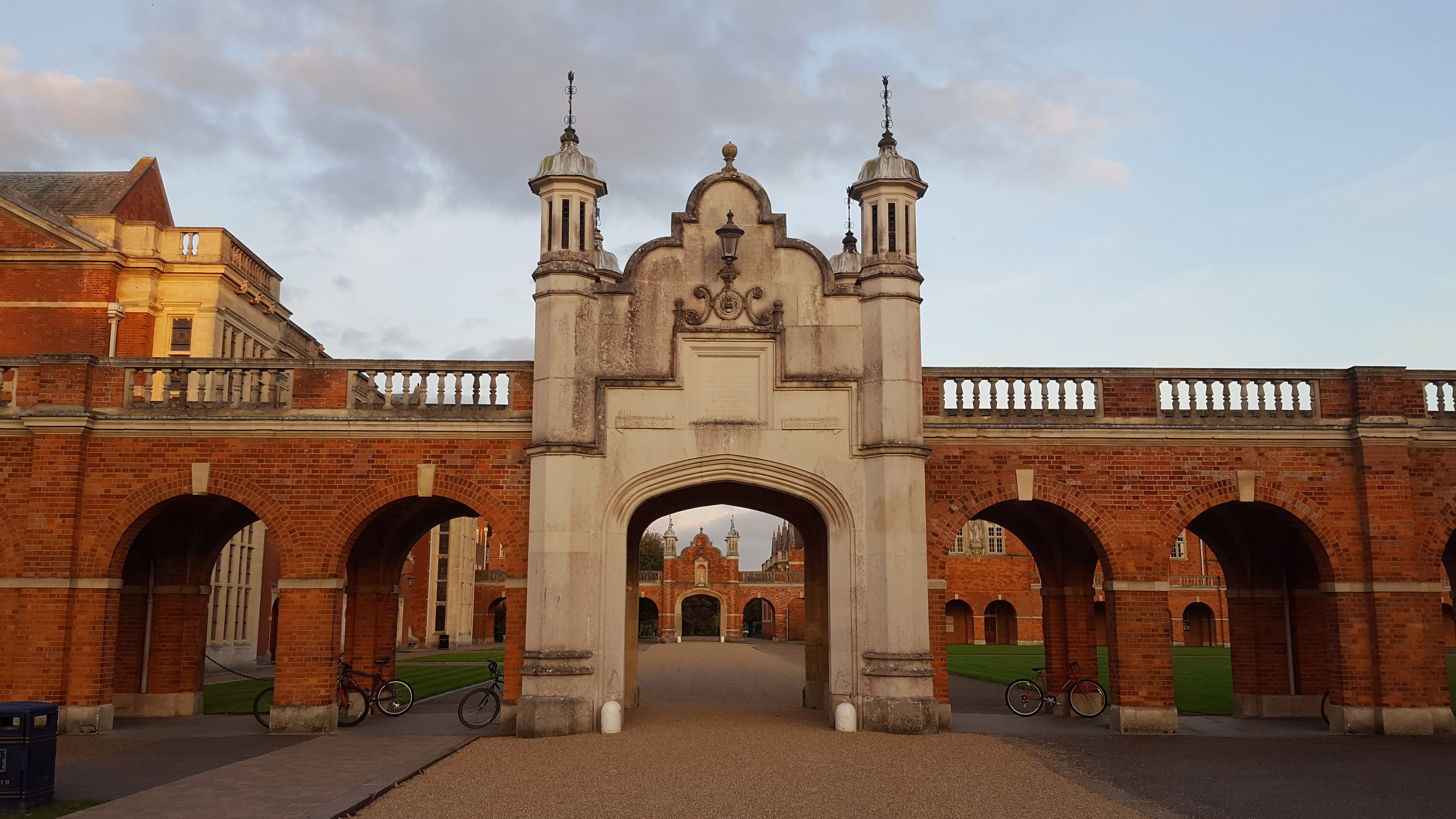
John Shaw's stone archways from Newgate Street

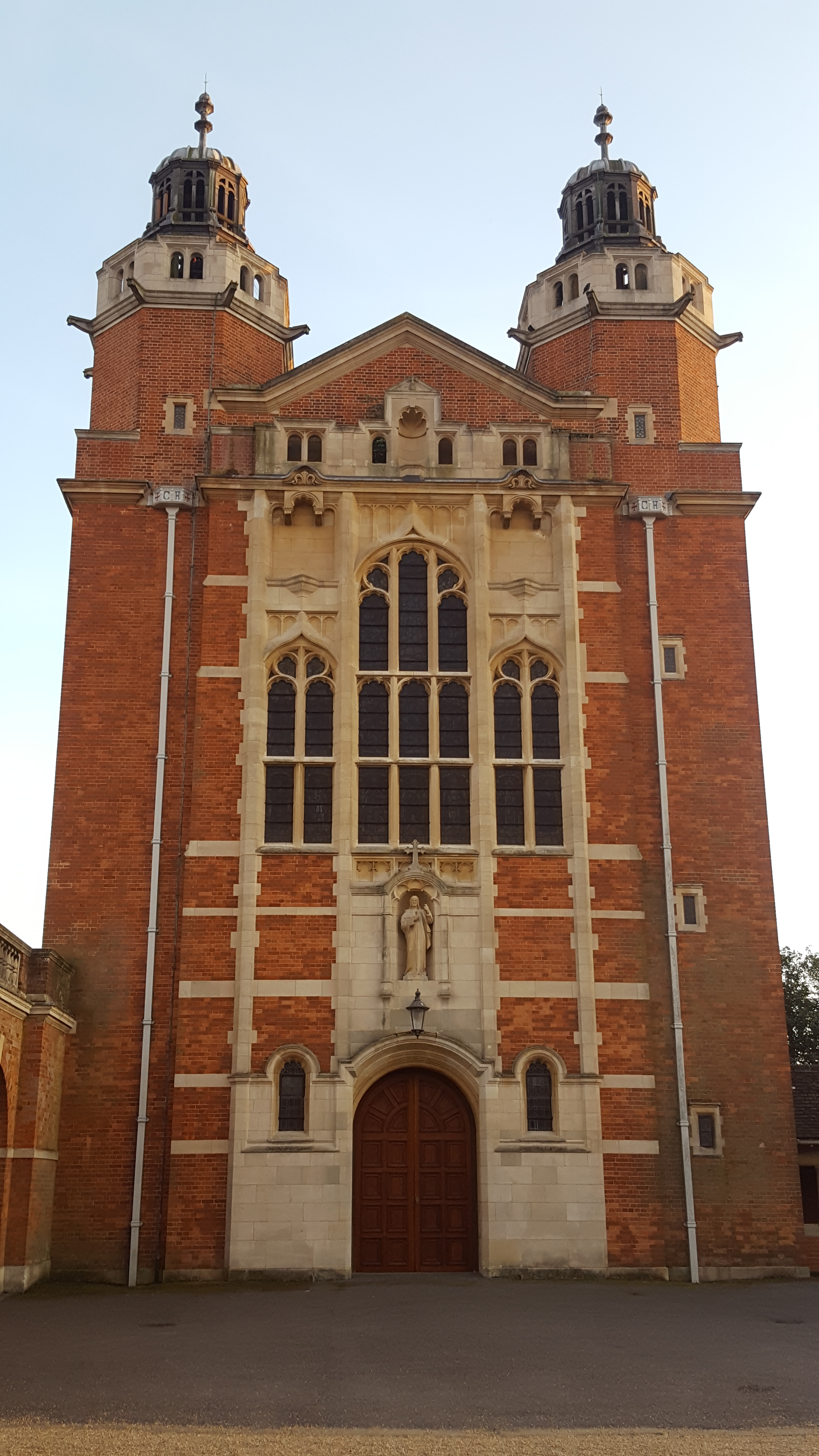
The school chapel

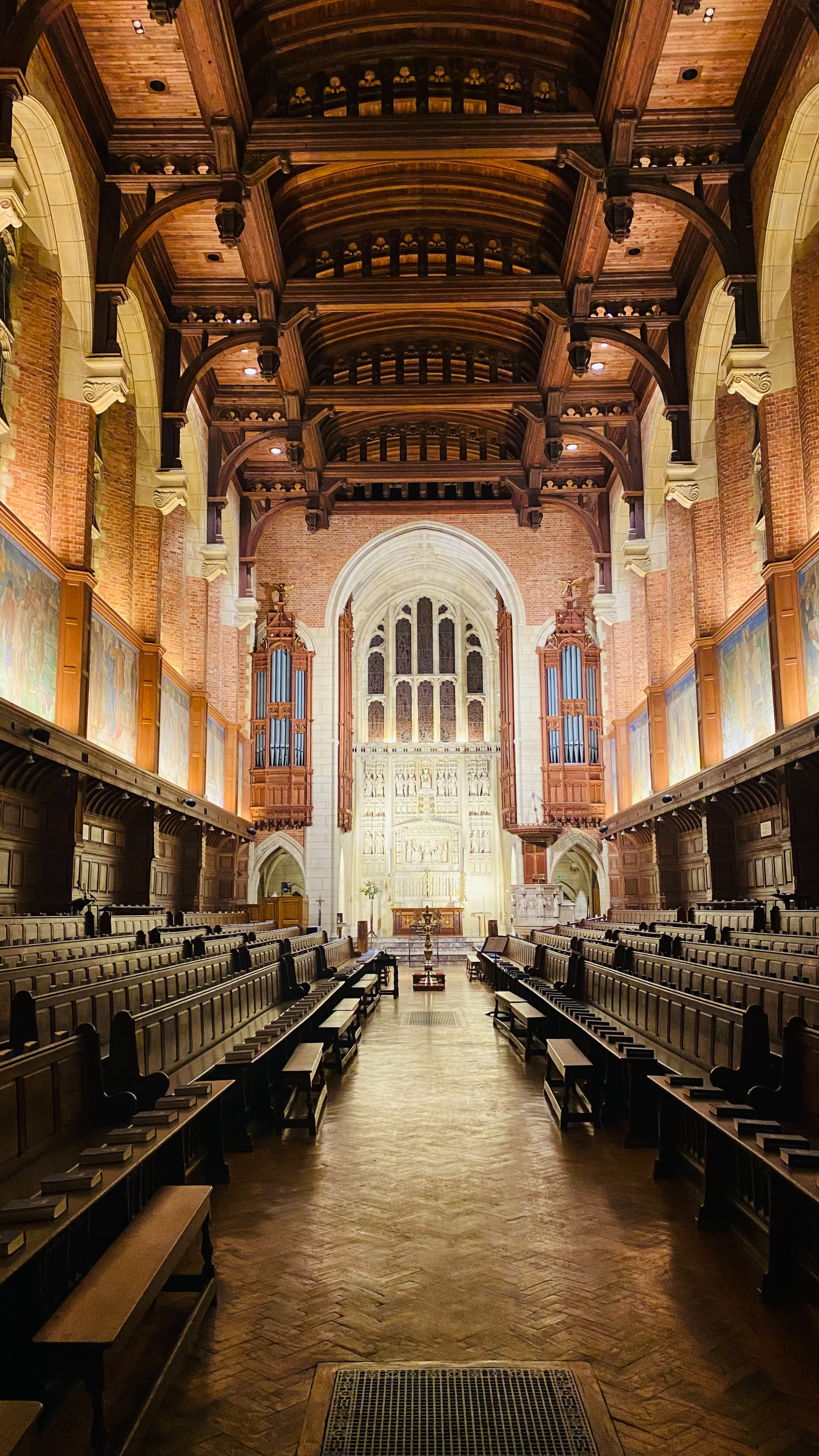
The school chapel interior

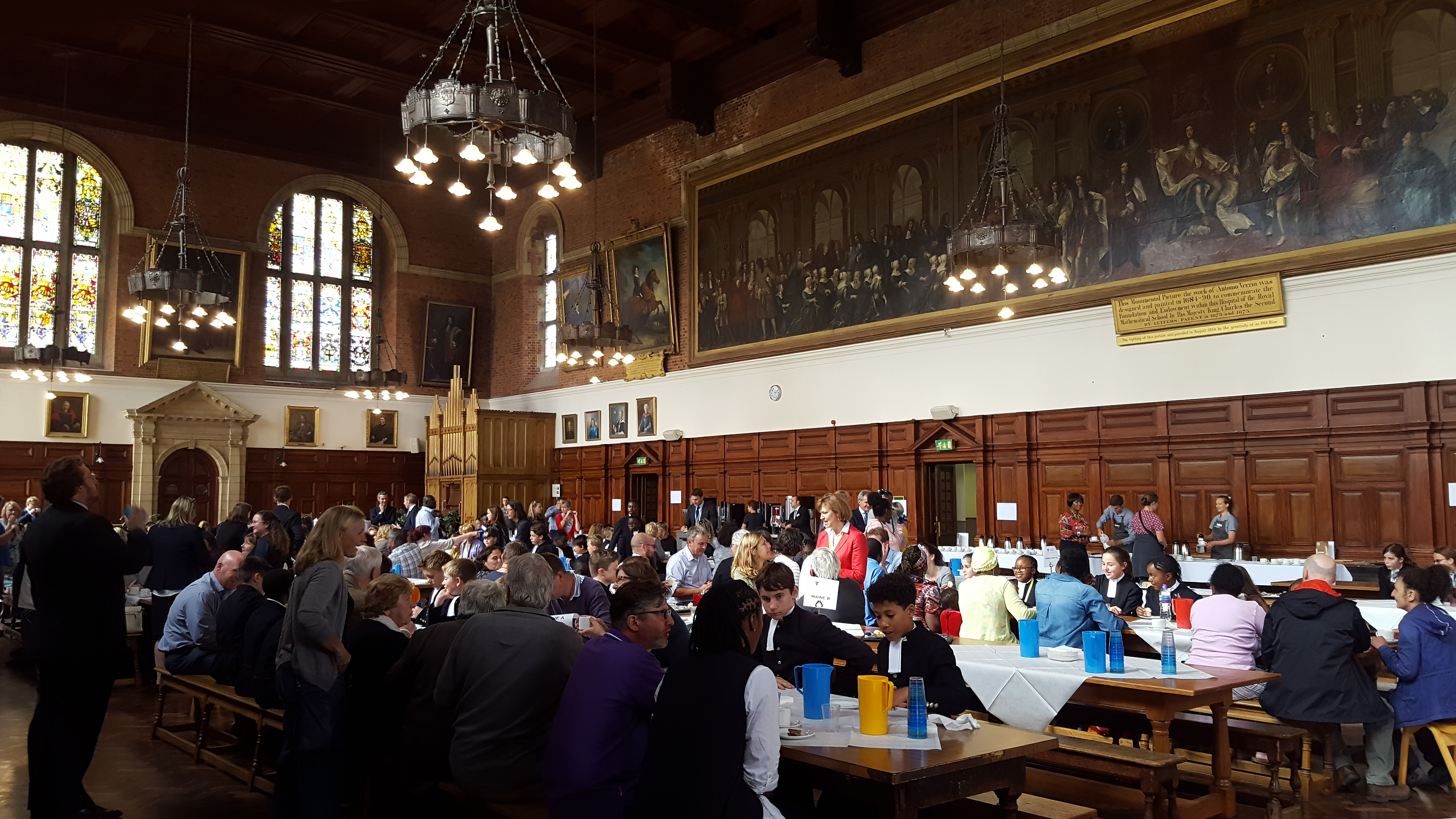
Pupils in the dining hall, with the Verrio painting in the background

== Traditions ==
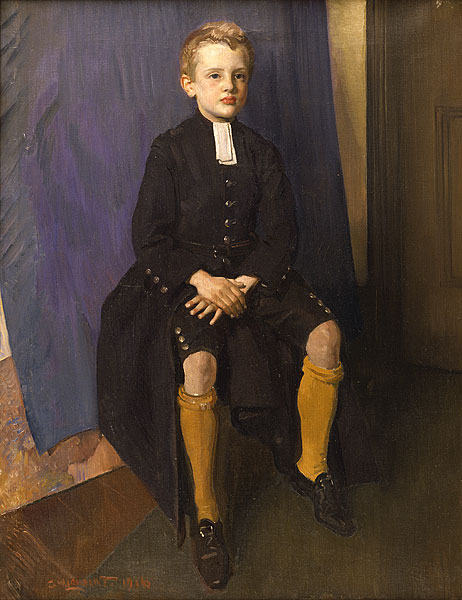
The composer Constant Lambert as a pupil, wearing the traditional uniform

Links with the City and the Lord Mayor of London are maintained, with an annual parade through the City of London on St Matthew's Day and a regular place in the Lord Mayor's Show.

One of the Christ's Hospital traditions is marching into lunch with the band, which is done every Monday, Wednesday, Friday, and Saturday, weather permitting.

Another is the annual speech-day parade, where the Lord Mayor of London and his procession watch the school perform a march-past through the main quad. They also join the school in chapel for a grand service, and eat lunch with the Grecian year and their parents. Lastly, they move to Big School to hear the Senior Grecian's oration and witness the Grecian prize-giving. This is held on the Saturday at the start of the Summer Half Term.

=== Uniform ===
The Tudor school uniform consists of belted, long blue coats, knee-breeches, yellow socks, and bands at the neck. The uniform has been in place since 1553. The nickname "Blue-coat School" comes from the blue coats worn by the students; however, the nickname used within the school community itself is "Housey" and the long coat is called a "Housey coat". Variants of the Housey Coat include a version with larger buttons and velvet cuffs, known as the 'Buttons' coat. These are issued to the Monitors, a group of Grecian prefects, as well as an academic commendation to Grecian pupils. Those in the latter category wear these coats with the third button on the cuff undone to signify this distinction.

Second and third form pupils wear a simple leather belt with a buckle. When pupils reach their "Little Erasmus" year (year 9), they were presented with more elaborate hallmarked sterling silver 'broadie' buckles and belts, which the pupils keep after leaving the school. However, today the 'broadie' buckles tend to be made of base metal with a silver coating. It is also not uncommon for pupils with parents or siblings who attended the school to wear additionally the buckles of their relatives, leading to some pupils to have as many as 5 buckles on their broadie belt. Special buckles are also issued to House Captains, as well as the Senior Grecian (the senior student of the school).

A complementary uniform was introduced for girls on re-unification of the schools in 1985 when the girls' part of the school closed in Hertford and moved to Horsham. This consists of a knee-length pleated skirt, summer jacket, yellow socks (for the boys and junior girls), and grey socks or grey/black tights for senior girls, as well as the long coat in winter, and the bands.

During periods of hot weather conditions, the Head Teacher may allow pupils to wear so-called 'Half Housey', where the Housey coat may be left off and shirts and breeches/skirts only be worn.

In 2011, students and alumni stated that they saw the uniform as an important way of giving the school a unique identity and unifying the school. Around that time the administrators had discussed the idea of updating the uniform. Over 95% of students voted in favour of keeping the original uniform.

== Admissions ==
As a guide, children entering Christ's Hospital at age 11 into Year 7 need to show evidence of academic potential, working towards the higher end of the ability range in both the Mathematics and English National Curriculum syllabuses.

The assessment process for a bursary place is in two stages. An initial assessment in October which is followed by a residential assessment in January.

Admission in Year 9 is also based on Christ's Hospitals own assessment process. Candidates for entry at age 13 into Year 9 who do not require a bursary may choose to apply to be tested at age 11 and have their place deferred.

All applicants at Year 12 should be on course to achieve a minimum of four A (level 7 grades) and four B (level 6 grades) at GCSE. Following an assessment process, offers are made which are conditional on achieved performance at GCSE.

In all cases reports will be requested from a candidate's current head teacher.

=== Historic methods of entry ===
Christ's Hospital has a number of historic methods of entry that are attached to bursary applications.

==== Wests' Gift for Children ====
John and Frances West lived in the latter part of the 17th and early part of the 18th centuries. John became a wealthy merchant in the City of London and lived in a house on the site that is now occupied by the Mansion House.

John and Frances had no children of their own but they did have strong family connections with Newbury, Reading, Twickenham and the City of London. Children from these areas are therefore encouraged to apply for a place at Christ's Hospital via the West Gift Bursary fund.

==== RAF Foundationers Trust and 617 Squadron ====
Sir Barnes Wallis, a former pupil, governor and treasurer set up the RAF Foundationers Trust in 1951. An award was made to him in recognition of his work by the 617 Squadron of the RAF and Wallis set up the fund with the award. The RAF Benevolent Fund donated a like amount.

The fund provides an income for the education of a small number of children in the school at any one time. Consideration for places is given to children of personnel who are serving or who have served in the RAF.

==== Royal Navy/Royal Mathematical School ====
Samuel Pepys was a governor and Vice President of the school; he instigated the opening of the Royal Mathematical School at Christ's Hospital in 1673 which was founded to educate children in mathematics for the practice of navigation. As a result, special consideration for a maximum of forty places is given to children of personnel who are serving, or have served in the Royal Navy, Royal Marines or Royal Naval Reserve.

==== City livery companies ====
Christ's Hospital was founded in the City of London over 460 years ago as a charity funded by city businesses and the church to provide training/education to poor street children. The school retains its connections with these organisations, some of which have an ancient right to 'present' a child to the school.

The school Admissions Office is able to advise whether any presentations are available for a child's year of entry.

== Academic results ==
Academic results:

- GCSE results (2023): 59% achieved grades 9-7.
- A Level results (2023): 41% attained A*/A grades, with 67% securing A*-B grades.
- Average IB point score (2023): average of 37 points.
- GCSE results (2019): 63% achieved grades 9-7.
- A Level results (2019): 35% attained A*/A grades, with 61% securing A*-B grades.
- Average IB score (2019): Average score stood at 34 points.

== External inspection ==
In late November 2018, Christ's Hospital underwent a whole school inspection carried out by the Independent Schools Inspectorate. The school met all standards without any action points given.

== School activities ==
=== Music ===
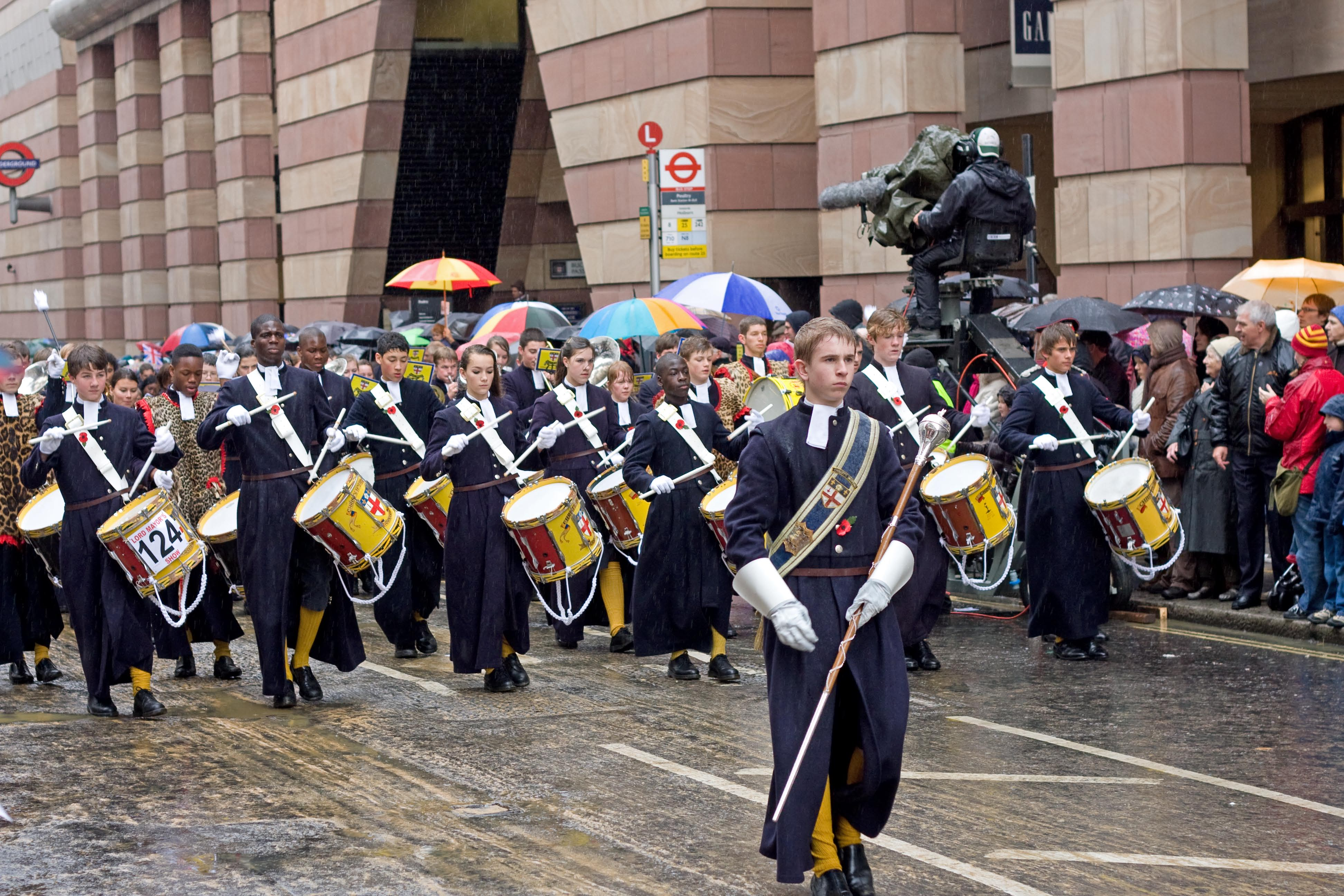
The Christ's Hospital Band participating in the Lord Mayor's Show in London in 2008

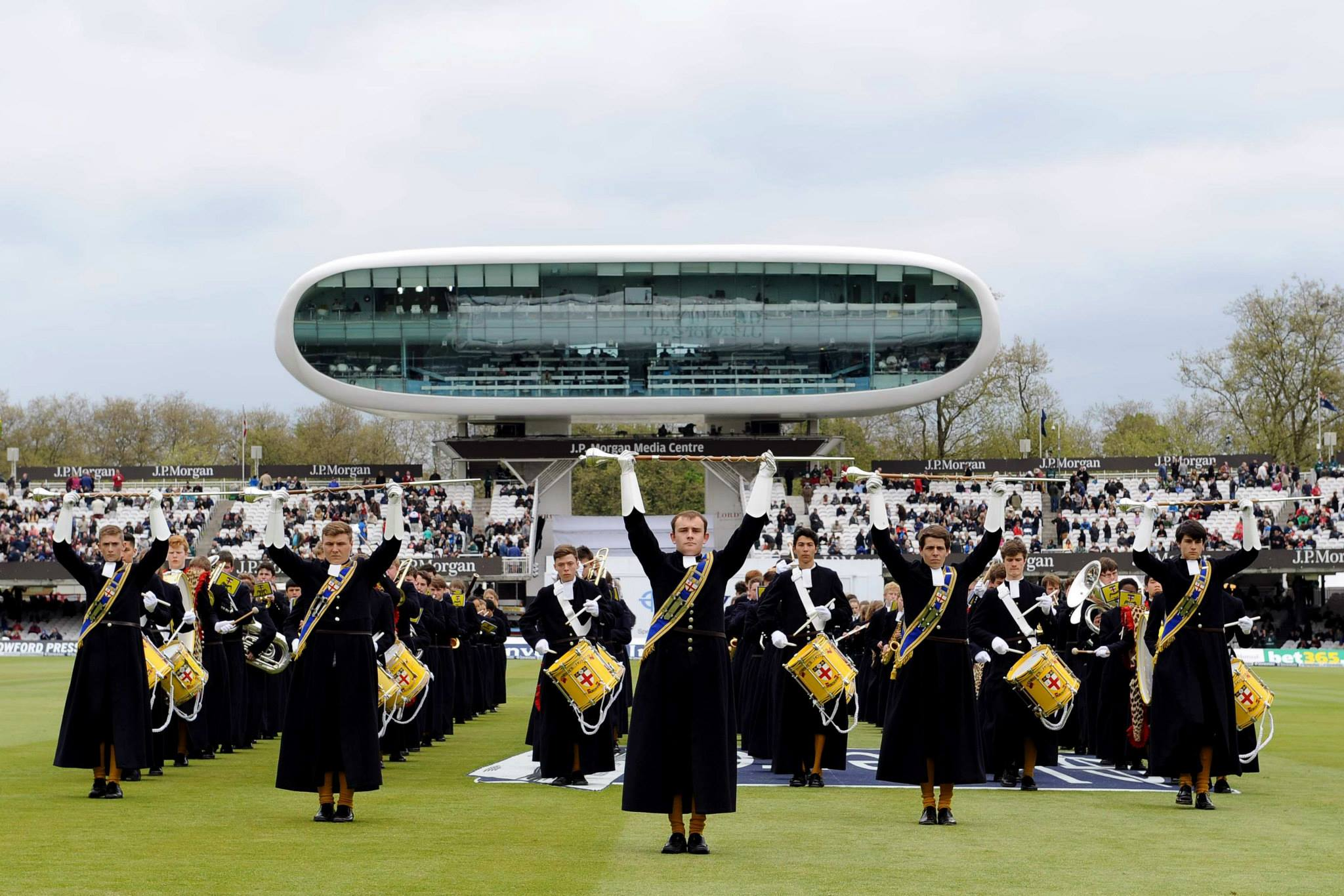
The Christ's Hospital Band performing at Lord's Cricket Ground in north London in 2013

Christ's Hospital has a long and distinguished musical tradition. From 1618 to 1622 Thomas Ravenscroft served as music master, and published his Whole Book of Psalms (1621) while there.

Alumni of Christ's Hospital Music School include conductors Sir Colin Davis, Charles Hazlewood, Adrian Bawtree, trumpeter David Mason (formerly Principal Trumpet of the Royal Philharmonic Orchestra), composer Tim Benjamin, and composer and conductor Constant Lambert.

The school's chapel has a large five-manual Rushworth and Dreaper organ, one of four organs in the school (the others being a 3-manual 1829 Hill in Big School, played on by Mendelssohn and Karg-Elert, a 2-manual Father Willis in the Dining Hall, and a Flight and Robson chamber organ in the Court Room). The near 150-strong Chapel Choir has made many recordings.

The school has a symphony orchestra, a chapel choir and other smaller instrumental ensembles and choirs. The Music Department organises a public concert every February at St John's, Smith Square in London.

Christ's Hospital was featured in the first series of the reality television programme Rock School, in which Gene Simmons of Kiss helped a group of pupils form their own rock band.

The school's marching band, Christ's Hospital Band, plays for the daily parade and performs in the annual Lord Mayor's Show in the City of London. The band has an engagement each summer at Lord's Cricket Ground. The band led the procession at the Queen's 80th birthday parade in London on 21 April 2006 and has played at Twickenham Stadium.

=== Drama ===
An Arts Centre complex designed by architect Bill Howell was opened in 1974, including a theatre with Tudor-style auditorium, an extension to the music school, the 'Octagon' rehearsal/performance space, and classrooms.

The Christ's Hospital Arts Centre served as a principal arts venue for Horsham and the surrounding area until the establishment of an arts centre in Horsham in the 1980s. A programme of performances continues to be open to the public.

Former pupils in theatre and film include Jason Flemyng, Leo Gregory, James D'Arcy, Michael Wilding and Roger Allam.

== Houses ==
Grecians East boarding house

Christ's Hospital has introduced a small number of day students since 2011; however, most of the students continue to be boarders. The school houses are named after notable Old Blues (the CH-specific term for alumni), primarily writers. Each house has an "A" and "B" side, home to roughly 45 pupils. The houses are arranged from west to east as follows:

=== Avenue houses ===
- Peele – George Peele (boys)
- Thornton – Edward Thornton (girls)
- Middleton – Thomas Middleton (boys)
- Coleridge – Samuel Taylor Coleridge (girls)
- Lamb – Charles Lamb (boys)
- Barnes – Thomas Barnes (girls)
- Maine – Henry James Sumner Maine (boys)
- Leigh-Hunt – Leigh Hunt (girls)

== Alumni ==
People educated at Christ's Hospital are called Old Blues.

== Staff ==
Headmasters have included:

- James Boyer (1778–1799)
- George Andrew Jacob (1853–1868)
- Arthur William Trollope (1799–1826)
- William Hamilton Fyfe (1919–1930?)

Other notable teachers have included:

- Edward Baldwin, 4th Earl Baldwin of Bewdley
- Adrian Bawtree
- Edward Buck
- Samuel Cobb
- Gerald Davies
- Ralph Henry Carless Davis
- Bruce Grindlay
- Craig Sellar Lang
- Derrick Somerset Macnutt
- William Wales (astronomer)
- Henry Robinson D. D., a 19th-century master

Also associated with the school are:

- Leonard Bates, cricket coach and groundsman
- John Flamsteed (Astronomer Royal), Governor
- Steve Gatting, football coach
- Samuel Pepys, Governor

== See also ==
- Christ's Hospital Band
- Christ's Hospital railway station
- Erasmus Smith

== Sources ==
- Davies-Jenkins, Sue (2010). Hang on tight : Christ's Hospital : from girlhood to Governor. Durham: The Memoir Club. ISBN 978-1-84104-499-6.
- Allan, G. A. T. (1984). Christ's Hospital. Revised by J. E. Morpurgo. London: Town & County. ISBN 0-86364-005-2.
- Plumley, Nick (1986). Christ's Hospital: a short history. Crampton and Sons.
- Mansell, Ken (2011). Christ's Hospital in the Victorian era. Twickenham: Ashwater Press. ISBN 978-0-9562561-2-6.
