= Sir William Talbot, 3rd Baronet =

Irish landowner, soldier and politician (died ...)

Sir William Talbot, 3rd Baronet PC (Ire) (c. 1643 – 1691) was the last of the Talbot baronets of Carton: his title was forfeited on account of his loyalty to King James II of England. He was an Irish politician and judge, who served briefly as Master of the Rolls in Ireland.

Family tree

William Talbot with wife, parents, and other selected relatives. (Note: This family tree is based on the genealogy of the earl of Tyrconnell, the barons Talbots of Malahide, and the baronets Talbot of Carton. Also see the lists of children in the text.)

William; 1st Baronet; Talbot d. 1634	Alison; Netterville
Robert; 2nd Baronet; 1608 – aft. 1670	Grace; Calvert	Garret	Margaret; Gaydon	Richard; 1st Earl; Tyrconnell c. 1630 – 1691
Richard; Talbot d. 1703; Malahide	Frances d. 1718	William; 3rd Baronet c. 1643 – 1691	Anne; Nugent d. 1710
Richard d.v.p.*	Robert d.v.p.*	John d.v.p.*	Frances; Wogan
Richard d. 1788	Margaret; 1st Baroness; Malahide d. 1834

Legend

XXX	Subject of the article	XXX	Talbot baronets of Carton	XXX	Earls of Tyrconnell	XXX	Barons Talbot of Malahide

*d.v.p. = predeceased his father (decessit vita patris)

== Birth and origins ==
William was born about 1643, the only son of Garret Talbot and his wife Margaret Gaydon. His father was the third of eight brothers, of whom the most eminent were Richard Talbot, 1st Earl of Tyrconnell, and Peter Talbot, Archbishop of Dublin. All three brothers served the Stuart dynasty with notable loyalty during the English Civil War and the Interregnum, and William shared his family's loyalty to the Stuarts.

== Early life ==
Talbot was called to the Bar, succeeded to his father's title in 1670, and for a time acted as Secretary to the Province of Maryland, presumably at the request of his maternal uncle, Cecilius Calvert, 2nd Baron Baltimore, who was Proprietor of Maryland.

The Talbot family was devoutly Roman Catholic; William's uncle Archbishop Talbot died in prison in 1680, a victim of the fabricated Popish Plot. Perhaps inspired by his uncle's example, Sir William in 1682 made a public plea for religious toleration of Catholics. He became a Commissioner of the Revenue in 1682, a member of the Privy Council of Ireland in 1687 and Master of the Rolls in 1689.

== Marriage ==
He married in 1683 Lady Anne Nugent, widow of Lucas Dillon, 6th Viscount Dillon, and daughter of Richard Nugent, 2nd Earl of Westmeath and Mary Nugent; she died in 1710. They had no children.

== Later life and death ==
Coat of Arms of William Talbot

His open Catholic beliefs, combined with the influence of his uncle Lord Tyrconnell who, as Lord Deputy of Ireland, became for a short time almost all-powerful in Ireland, gained him preferment, especially during the reign of the ardently Catholic King James II. Like all the judges promoted by James II, his knowledge of the law and the size of his practice were the subject of harsh criticism by his enemies.

He sat in the Patriot Parliament of 1689 as member for Meath.

After the downfall of James II, Talbot was attainted and his lands and title were subsequently forfeited under the Williamite Settlement.

He died either in Ireland, at Galway, in May 1691, or on the continent, in France or in Spain, on 26 December 1724.

== Notes and references ==
=== Sources ===
- Ball, Francis Elrington (1926). The Judges in Ireland 1221–1921. Vol. I (1st ed.). London: John Murray. OCLC 832154869. – 1221 to 1690
- Burke, Bernard (1883). A Genealogical History of the Dormant, Abeyant, Forfeited and Extinct Peerages of the British Empire (New ed.). London: Harrison. OCLC 499232768.
- Burke, Bernard; Burke, Ashworth Peter (1915). A Genealogical and Heraldic History of the Peerage and Baronetage, the Privy Council, Knightage and Companionage (77th ed.). London: Harrison. OCLC 1155471554.
- G. E. C. (1900). Complete Baronetage, 1611 to 1800. Vol. I (1st ed.). Exeter: William Pollard & Co. OCLC 866278985. – 1611 to 1625
- Kenyon, John (1972). The Popish Plot. New York: St. Martin's Press. OCLC 1036783743.
- Lodge, John (1789). Archdall, Mervyn (ed.). The Peerage of Ireland or, A Genealogical History of the Present Nobility of that Kingdom. Vol. IV. Dublin: James Moore. OCLC 264906028. – Viscounts
- O'Hart, John (1892). Irish Pedigrees: Or, the Origin and Stem of the Irish Nation. Vol. I (5th ed.). Dublin: James Duffy & Co. OCLC 7239210. – Irish stem

Baronetage of Ireland
Preceded by Robert Talbot	Baronet (of Carton); 1670–1691	Extinct
