= Talbot baronets =

Extinct baronetcy in the Baronetage of Ireland

There have been two baronetcies created for persons with the surname Talbot, both in the Baronetage of Ireland. One creation was forfeited while the other is extinct.

The Talbot baronetcy, of Carton in the County of Kildare, was created in the Baronetage of Ireland on 4 February 1623 for the Irish lawyer and politician William Talbot. The third Baronet was attainted in 1691 and the baronetcy was forfeited. Peter Talbot, second son of the first Baronet, was Roman Catholic Archbishop of Dublin. Richard Talbot, 1st Earl of Tyrconnell, Lord Lieutenant of Ireland, was the eighth and youngest son of the first Baronet.

The Talbot baronetcy, of Mickleham in the County of Surrey and of Belfast in the County of Antrim, was created in the Baronetage of Ireland on 31 March 1790 for Charles Henry Talbot. He was the son of Major-General Sherrington Talbot, son of the Right Reverend William Talbot, Bishop of Durham, and brother of Charles Talbot, 1st Baron Talbot (see Earl Talbot). This branch of the Talbot family descended from the Honourable Sir Gilbert Talbot (died 1518), third son of John Talbot, 2nd Earl of Shrewsbury (see Earl of Shrewsbury). The second Baronet sat as Member of Parliament for Weobly, Rye and Bletchingley. The title became extinct on the death of the third Baronet in 1850.

== Talbot baronets, of Carton (1623) ==
- Sir William Talbot, 1st Baronet (died 1634)
- Sir Robert Talbot, 2nd Baronet (c. 1610–1670)
- Sir William Talbot, 3rd Baronet (c. 1643–1691)

== Talbot baronets, of Mickleham and Belfast (1790) ==
- Sir Charles Henry Talbot, 1st Baronet (1720–1798)
- Sir Charles Talbot, 2nd Baronet (1751–1812)
- Sir George Talbot, 3rd Baronet (1761–1850)

== See also ==
- Earl of Shrewsbury
- Earl Talbot
- Earl of Tyrconnell
