= History of Ireland (1534–1691) =

The history of Ireland between 1534 and 1691 saw the conquest and colonisation of the island by the English state and the settlement of tens of thousands of Protestant settlers from England, Wales and Scotland. Ireland had been partially conquered by England in the late twelfth and thirteenth centuries, yet had never been fully brought under English rule. The Tudor conquest of the sixteenth century largely reduced the Gaelic lords of Leinster, Munster, Connacht and Ulster to English rule, while colonial projects like the Munster Plantation and Ulster Plantation of the sixteenth and seventeenth centuries transformed landholding in the country. In the process the Irish were subordinated to the rule of London-based governments and a British Protestant minority became the dominant political and economic class ruling over an Irish Roman Catholic majority. The period is bounded by the dates 1534, when Thomas FitzGerald, 10th Earl of Kildare publicly renounced his allegiance to his cousin King Henry VIII, Lord of Ireland, and 1691, when the Catholic Jacobites surrendered at Limerick, thus confirming Protestant dominance in Ireland. This is sometimes called the early modern period.

The English Reformation, by which Henry VIII broke with Papal authority in 1534, was to change Ireland totally. While Henry VIII broke English Catholicism from Rome, his son Edward VI moved further, breaking with Papal doctrine completely. While the English, the Welsh and, later, the Scots accepted Protestantism, the Irish remained Catholic. Queen Mary I then reverted the state to Catholicism in 1553–58, and Queen Elizabeth I broke again with Rome in 1559. These confusing changes determined their relationship with the British state for the next four hundred years, as the Reformation coincided with a determined effort on behalf of the English state to re-conquer and colonise Ireland thereafter. The religious schism meant that the native Irish and the (Roman Catholic) Old English were to be excluded from power in the new settlement unless they converted to Protestantism.

== Re-conquest and rebellion (1534–1607) ==
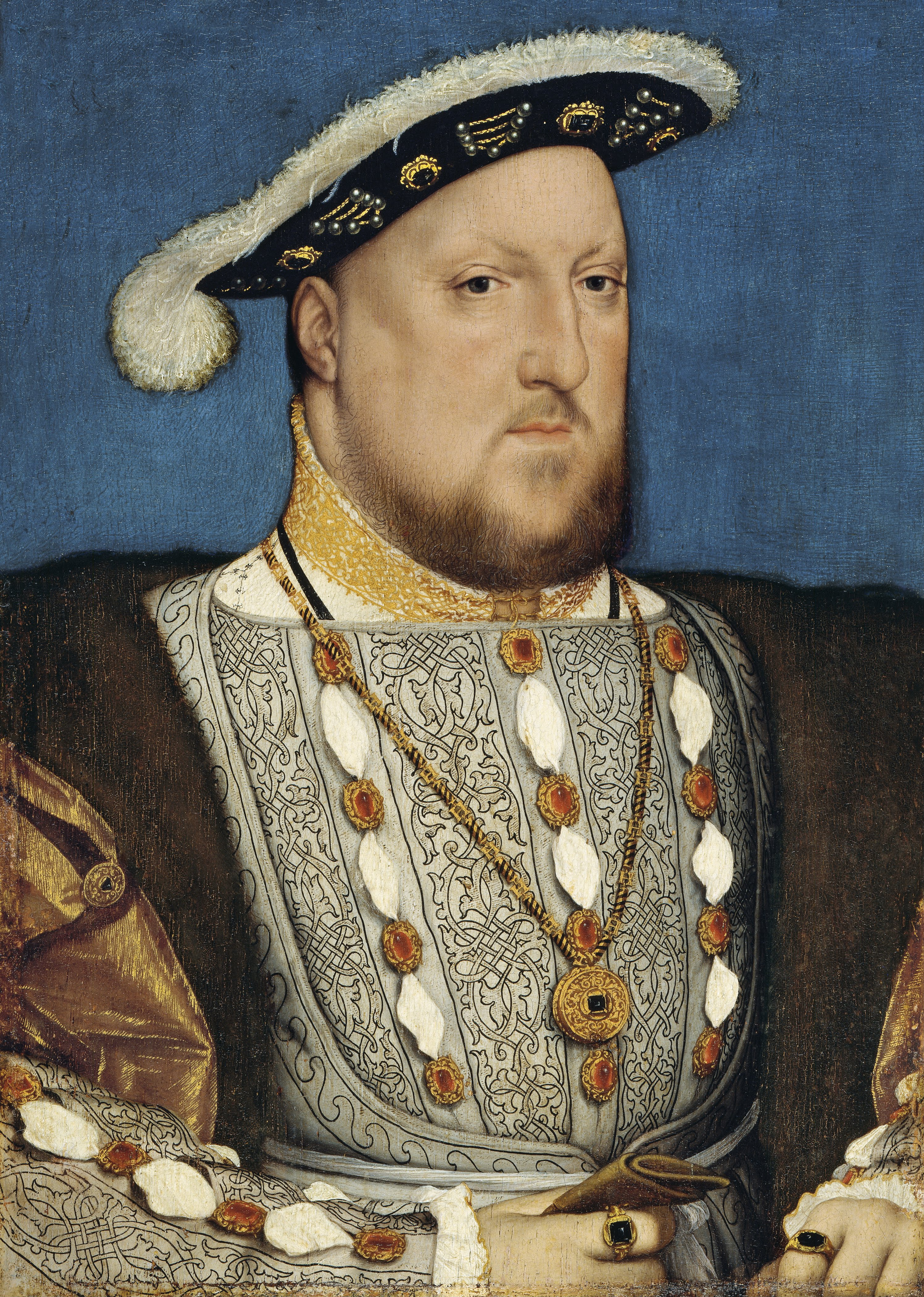
Henry VIII, King of England and Ireland, who founded the Kingdom of Ireland and began the English re-conquest of the country, by Hans Holbein the Younger

There is some debate about why Henry VIII of England resolved to re-conquer Ireland completely. However, the most immediate reason was that the Fitzgerald dynasty of Kildare, who had become the effective rulers of Ireland in the 15th century, had become very unreliable allies of the Tudor monarchs. Most seriously, they had invited Burgundian troops into Dublin to crown the Yorkist pretender, Lambert Simnel as King of England in 1487. In 1534, Silken Thomas Fitzgerald went into open rebellion against the crown. Henry VIII put down this rebellion and then set about to pacify Ireland and bring it all under English government control, perhaps to prevent it from becoming a base for foreign invasions of England (a concern that was to be sustained for another 400 or more years).

Ireland was changed from a lordship to a full Kingdom under Henry VIII. From the period of the original lordship in the 12th century onwards, Ireland had retained its own bicameral Parliament of Ireland, consisting of a House of Commons and a House of Lords. It was restricted for most of its existence in terms both of membership – Gaelic Irishmen were barred from membership – and of powers, notably by Poynings' Law of 1494, which required the approval of the English Privy Council before any draft bills might be introduced to the Parliament. After 1541, Henry VIII admitted native Irish lords into both houses and recognised their land titles, in return for their submission to him as King of Ireland. However, the real power in Ireland throughout this period lay not with the Parliament, but with the Lord Deputy of Ireland, who was nominated by the King of England to govern Ireland. The Parliament met only when called by the Lord Deputy, when he wanted to pass new laws or raise new taxes. The Lord Deputy's permanent advisors were the Irish Privy Council.

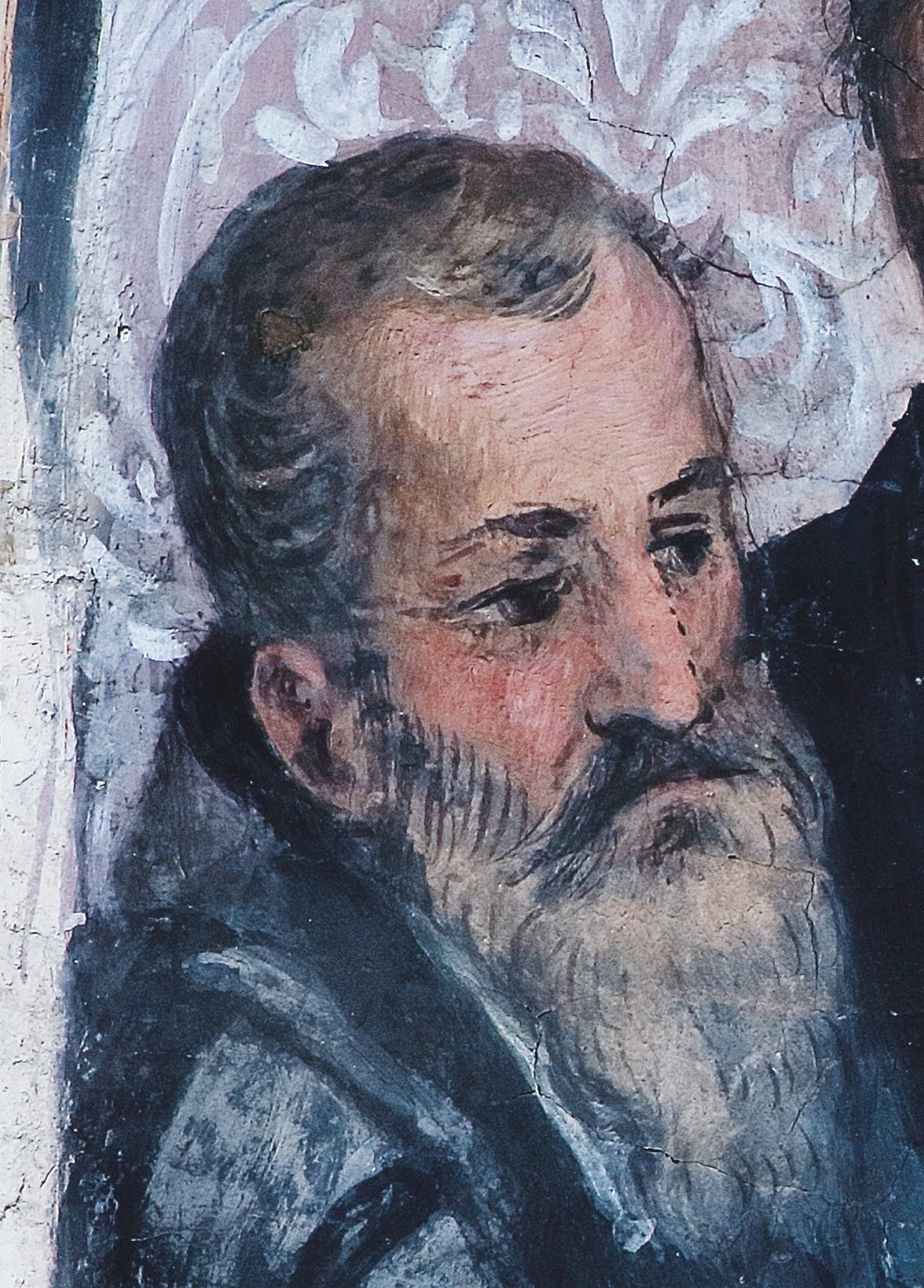
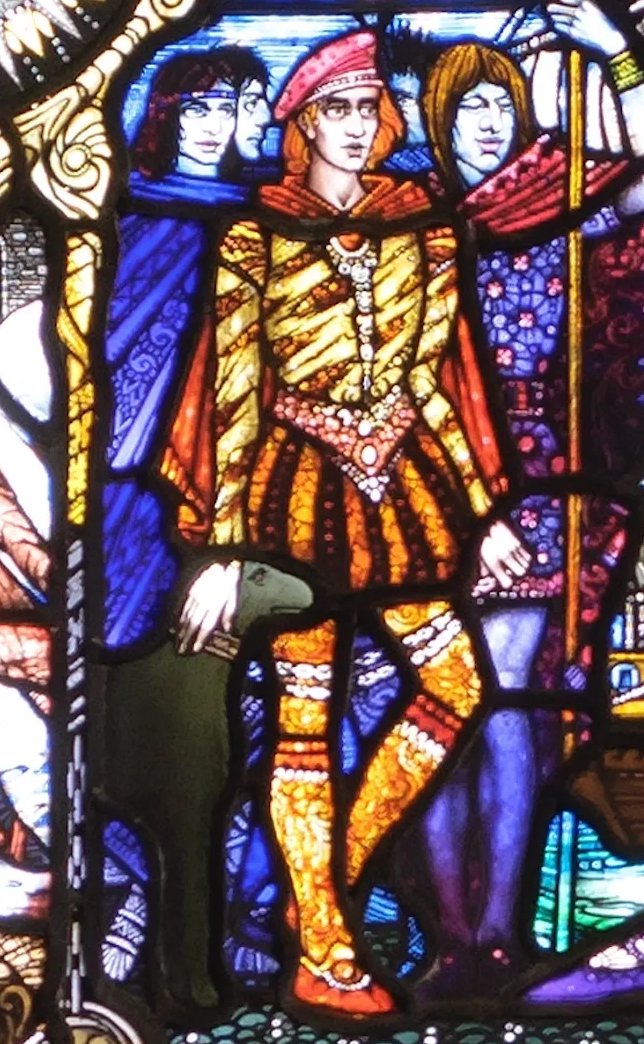
Hugh O'Neill, Earl of Tyrone (left; c. 1550–1616) and Hugh Roe O'Donnell (1572–1602) led the Irish confederacy during the Nine Years' War.

With the institutions of government in place, the next step was to extend the control of the English Kingdom of Ireland over all of its claimed territory. Henry VIII's officials were tasked with extending the rule of this new Kingdom throughout Ireland by the policy of "surrender and regrant". They either negotiated or fought with the autonomous Irish Kings and lords. This took nearly a century to achieve, and the re-conquest was accompanied by a great deal of bloodshed, as it led to the assimilation – sometimes abolition – of lordships that had been independent for several hundred years.

The re-conquest was completed during the reigns of Elizabeth I and James I, after several bloody conflicts. The Desmond Rebellions (1569–1573 and 1579–1583) took place in the southern province of Munster, when the Fitzgerald Earl of Desmond dynasty resisted the imposition of an English governor into the province. The second of these rebellions was put down by means of a forced famine, which may have killed up to a third of Munster's population. The most serious threat to English rule in Ireland came during the Nine Years' War (1593–1603) when Hugh O'Neill and Hugh Roe O'Donnell, the most powerful chieftains in the northern province of Ulster, rebelled against English government. This war developed into a nationwide revolt where O'Neill and O'Donnell successfully obtained military aid from Spain, which was then in conflict with England during the Anglo-Spanish War. A Spanish expeditionary force sent to Ireland made landfall in October 1601, but was defeated by English forces at the Battle of Kinsale on 3 January 1602. O'Donnell died in late 1602 and was succeeded by his brother Rory. O'Neill eventually surrendered to the new Stuart King, James I, in 1603. After this point, the English authorities in Dublin established real control over Ireland for the first time, bringing a centralised form of justice to the entire island, and successfully disarmed the various lordships, both Irish and Old English. O'Neill, Rory and their allies subsequently fled Ireland for good in the Flight of the Earls in 1607. This removed the last major obstacle to English government in Ireland.

== Colonization and the religious question ==
The English had little success in converting either the native elite or the Irish people to the Protestant religion. Why the Protestant Reformation failed to take hold among the Irish is an enduring question. One of several answers lies in the fact that brutal methods were used by crown authority to pacify the country and exploit its resources, which heightened resentment of English rule. Additionally, a determined proselytising campaign carried out in Ireland by Counter-Reformation Catholic clergy, many of whom had been educated in seminaries on the continent. Irish Colleges had been established in many countries in Catholic Europe for the training of Irish Catholic priests and the education of the Irish Catholic gentry. Finally, the printing press, which had played a major role in disseminating Protestant ideas in Europe, came to Ireland very late.

From the mid-16th and into the early 17th century, crown governments carried out a policy of colonisation known as Plantations. Scottish and English Protestants were sent as colonists to the provinces of Munster, Ulster and the counties of Laois and Offaly (see also Plantations of Ireland). The largest of these projects, the Plantation of Ulster, had settled up to 80,000 English and Scots in the north of Ireland by 1641. The so-called Ulster Scots were predominantly Presbyterian, which distinguished them from the Anglican English colonists.

These settlers, who had a British and Protestant identity, would form the ruling class of future British administrations in Ireland. A series of Penal Laws discriminated against all Christian faiths other than the established (Anglican) Church of Ireland. The principal victims of these laws were Roman Catholics and, from the late 17th century on, adherents of Presbyterianism. From 1607, Catholics were barred from public office and from serving in the army. In 1615, the constituencies of the Irish Parliament were altered so that Protestants might form the majority of 108–102 in any given vote in the Irish House of Commons. The Catholic majority in the Irish House of Lords persisted until the Patriot Parliament of 1689, with the exception of the Commonwealth period (1650–60).

== A New Order (1607–1641) ==
The difficulty in controlling the extremities of Ireland from London or Dublin early in the 17th century was demonstrated by the presence of pirates on the Munster coast. In particular, the townland of Leamcon (near Schull, County Cork) became a pirate stronghold. By pleading "benefit of clergy", literate pirates in Ireland could escape secular trial (making their prosecution much more difficult) until Irish law was brought into line with English law in 1613.

In the early years of the 17th century, it looked possible for a time that, because of immigration of English and Scottish settlers, Ireland could be peacefully integrated into British society. However, this was prevented by the continued discrimination by the English authorities against Irish Catholics on religious grounds.

The pre-Elizabethan Irish population is usually divided into the "Old (or Gaelic) Irish", and the Old English, or descendants of medieval Hiberno-Norman settlers. These groups were historically antagonistic, with English settled areas such as the Pale around Dublin, south Wexford, and other walled towns being fortified against the rural Gaelic clans. However, by the 17th century, the cultural divide between these groups, especially at elite social levels, was declining. For example, most Old English lords not only spoke the Irish language, but extensively patronised Irish poetry and music. Intermarriage was also common. Moreover, in the wake of the Elizabethan conquest, the native population became defined by their shared religion, Roman Catholicism, in distinction to the new Protestant British settlers and the officially Protestant British government of Ireland. During the decades in between the end of the Elizabethan wars of conquest in 1603 and the outbreak of rebellion in 1641, Irish Catholics felt themselves to be increasingly threatened by and discriminated against by the English government of Ireland.

Most of the Irish upper classes, however, were not ideologically opposed to the sovereignty of the King of England over Ireland, but wanted to be full subjects of the triple Stuart monarchy and maintain their pre-eminent position in Irish society. This was prevented by their religious dissidence and the threat posed to them by the extension of the Plantations. The Protestant settler-dominated Government of Ireland tried to confiscate more land from the native landowners by questioning their medieval land titles and as punishment for non-attendance at Protestant services. In response, Irish Catholics appealed directly to the King, first to James I and then Charles I, for full rights as subjects and toleration of their religion: a programme known as The Graces. On several occasions, the Monarchs appeared to have reached an agreement with them, granting their demands in return for raising taxes. However, Irish Catholics were disappointed when, on paying the increased levies, the King postponed the implementation of their demands. What was more, by the late 1630s, Thomas Wentworth, Charles's representative in Ireland, was proposing further widespread confiscations of native land to break the power of the Irish Catholic upper classes. It is likely that this would eventually have provoked armed resistance from Irish Catholics at some point, but the actual rebellion was sparked by a political crisis in Scotland and England that led to civil war in the three Kingdoms.

== Civil wars, Land confiscations and Penal Laws (1641–1691) ==
After Irish Catholic rebellion and civil war, Oliver Cromwell, on behalf of the English Commonwealth, re-conquered Ireland between 1649 and 1651. Under his government, landownership in Ireland passed overwhelmingly to Protestant colonists

The fifty years from 1641 to 1691 saw two catastrophic periods of civil war in Ireland 1641–53 and 1689–91, which killed hundreds of thousands of people and left others in permanent exile. The wars, which pitted Irish Catholics against British forces and Protestant settlers, ended in the almost complete dispossession of the Catholic landed elite.

=== The Confederate War and Cromwellian conquest ===
In the mid-17th century, Ireland was convulsed by eleven years of warfare, beginning with the Rebellion of 1641, when Irish Catholics, threatened by expanding power of the anti-Catholic English Parliament and Scottish Covenanters at the expense of the King, rebelled against English and Protestant domination. The Rising, launched in Ulster by Féilim Ó Néill, provoked an outbreak of anarchic violence around the country, after which it was joined by most Irish Catholic lords and their followers. In some respects, the rebellion was the end product of the long term alienation of Irish Catholics with English policies in Ireland. However, it was sparked off by the fear of impending civil war in the British Isles as a whole.

The rebellion was marked by a number of massacres of Protestant settlers, particularly in Ulster, an event which scarred communal relations in Ireland for centuries afterwards.

As a result of the outbreak of the English Civil War in 1642, no English troops were available to put down the uprising and the rebels were left in control of most of Ireland. The Catholic majority briefly ruled the country as Confederate Ireland (1642–1649) during the subsequent Wars of the Three Kingdoms in Britain and Ireland. The Confederate regime allied themselves with Charles I and the English Royalists, though they did not sign a formal treaty with them until 1649. Had the Royalists won the English Civil War, the result could have been an autonomous Catholic ruled Ireland. However, the Royalists were defeated by the Parliamentarians, Charles I was executed and Oliver Cromwell re-conquered Ireland in 1649–1653 on behalf of the English Commonwealth. The Cromwellian conquest of Ireland was marked by atrocities, such as the massacre of the Royalist garrison at the Siege of Drogheda in 1649. Another policy implemented by the Cromwellian regime was the deportation of prisoners of war to the West Indies. Even worse was a scorched earth policy carried out by Parliamentarian commanders to subdue Irish guerrilla fighters, which caused famine throughout the country.

As punishment for the rebellion of 1641, almost all lands owned by Irish Catholics were confiscated and given to British settlers. The remaining Catholic landowners were transplanted to Connacht. See also Act of Settlement 1652. In addition, Catholics were barred from the Irish Parliament altogether, forbidden to live in towns and from marrying Protestants (although not all of these laws were strictly enforced). It has been calculated that up to a third of Ireland's population (4–600,000 people) died in these wars, either in fighting, or in the accompanying famine and plague. The Cromwellian conquest therefore left bitter memories – to say the least – in Irish popular culture.

=== Restoration ===
An uneasy peace returned with the Restoration of the monarchy in England and Charles II made some efforts to conciliate Irish Catholics with compensation and land grants. (See also Act of Settlement 1662). Most Catholics, however were disappointed that the Cromwellian land confiscations were, on the whole, allowed to stand. Protestants, on the other hand, felt that Irish Catholics had been treated far too leniently by Charles, and deserved to be punished for their massacres of Protestant civilians in 1641. In 1678, there was another brief burst of anti-Catholic repression during the Popish Plot, when it was rumoured that Irish Catholics were planning another rebellion with French help. Two Catholic Bishops, Peter Talbot and Oliver Plunkett were arrested. Talbot died in prison and Plunkett was hanged, drawn and quartered.

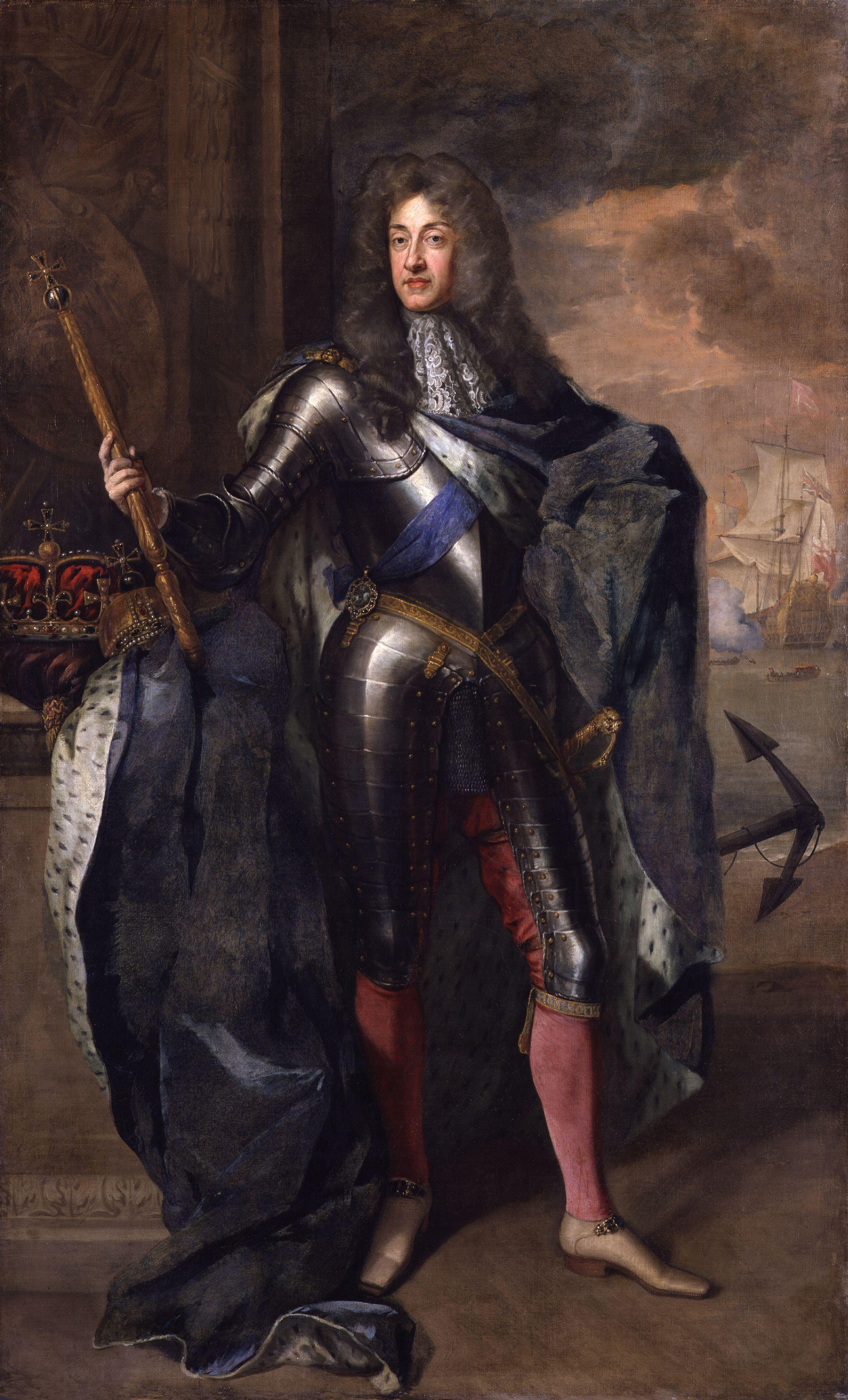
Portrait of James II by Godfrey Kneller. Irish Catholics, known as Jacobites, fought for James in 1689–91, but they failed to restore him to the throne of Ireland, England and Scotland

The Restoration government also drew on Irish revenues for military commitments outside Ireland. The Tangier establishment in North Africa was charged to the Irish Exchequer until the colony was abandoned in 1684; in 1678 Ireland was required to contribute £44,000 annually towards its maintenance.

=== The War of the Two Kings ===
However, within a generation of the Restoration, Ireland was at war again. In the reign of the Catholic King James II of England, Irish Catholics briefly looked like recovering their pre-eminent position in Irish society. James repealed much of the anti-Catholic legislation, allowed Catholics into the Irish Parliament and the Army and appointed a Catholic, Richard Talbot, 1st Earl of Tyrconnell, as Lord Deputy of Ireland. Protestants in Ireland could do little about this turn of events.

However, with the Glorious Revolution of 1688, James II was deposed by the English Parliament and replaced by William of Orange, with the help of a Dutch invasion force. Irish Catholics backed James to try to reverse the Penal Laws and land confiscations, whereas Irish and British Protestants supported William to preserve their dominance in the country. Richard Talbot, the Lord Deputy, raised a Jacobite army from among Irish Catholics and seized all the strong points around the country, with the exception of Derry, which was besieged by his men. James, backed by the French King Louis XIV, arrived in Ireland in 1689 with French troops. The Siege of Derry was broken when General Percy Kirke arrived with a relief force.

The same year Marshal Schomberg landed with a major Williamite expedition and captured Carrickfergus. He then advanced south to Dundalk where the two armies took part in a long stand-off before retreating into winter quarters. The following year William III landed at Carrickfergus with a multi-national force of reinforcements, including British, Dutch and Danish troops. The two Kings fought for the English, Scottish and Irish thrones in the Williamite War, most famously at the Battle of the Boyne in 1690, where James's forces were defeated. Although not militarily decisive, this battle is remembered as a great Williamite victory because James fled Ireland for France after the battle, effectively conceding defeat to William. Jacobite resistance in Ireland continued for another year however, winning a success at the Siege of Limerick, but was finally ended after the Battle of Aughrim in July 1691, when their main army was destroyed. They surrendered at Limerick shortly afterwards. The Jacobite army left the country under the terms of the Treaty of Limerick, negotiated by Patrick Sarsfield, to enter French service. The war, while not as destructive as that of the 1640s and 1650s, was nevertheless a shattering defeat for the old Irish Catholic landed classes, who never recovered their former position in Irish society.

=== Protestant Ascendancy ===
Penal Laws (which had been allowed to lapse somewhat after the English Restoration) were re-applied with great harshness after this war, as the Protestant elite wanted to ensure that the Irish Catholic landed classes would not be in a position to repeat their rebellions of the 17th century. In fact, many new Penal Laws were introduced, which put restrictions on Catholics inheriting property. As a result of these laws, Catholic landownership fell from around 14% in 1691 to around 5% in the course of the next century.

In addition, as of 1704, Presbyterians were also barred from holding public office, bearing arms and entering certain professions. This was in part due to the distrust the mostly English Anglican establishment had for the mostly Scottish Presbyterian community, which by now had become a majority in Ulster. By the end of the 17th century, Ireland's population was about 25% Protestant (including all denominations) of whom Anglicans (about 13%) formed the ruling Protestant Ascendancy. For the 18th century see Ireland 1691-1801.

== See also ==
- Early Modern Irish language
- Irish of Nantes

== Sources ==
- Canny, Nicholas P (May 1976). The Elizabethan Conquest of Ireland: A Pattern Established, 1565–76. Sussex: Harvester Press Ltd. ISBN 0-85527-034-9.
- Canny, Nicholas P (3 May 2001). Making Ireland British, 1580–1650. Oxford University Press. ISBN 0-19-820091-9.
- Hayes-McCoy, Gerard Anthony (June 1989). Irish Battles. Belfast: Appletree Press. ISBN 0-86281-212-7.
- Lenihan, Pádraig (2003). 1690: Battle of the Boyne. Tempus. ISBN 0-75243-304-0.
- Lenihan, Pádraig (2001). Confederate Catholics at War 1641–49. Cork University Press. ISBN 1-85918-244-5.
- Lennon, Colm (March 1995). Sixteenth Century Ireland – The Incomplete Conquest. Dublin: St. Martin's Press. ISBN 0-312-12462-7.
- Moody, T. W.; Martin, Francis X.; Byrne, F. J. (1991). A new history of Ireland: Early modern Ireland, 1534–1691. Oxford University Press. ISBN 978-0-19-820242-4.
- O'Brien, Richard Barry, ed. (1903). Studies in Irish History, 1649-1775 . Dublin: Browne and Nolan, Ltd. – via Wikisource.
- Ó Siochrú, Micheál (1999). Confederate Ireland 1642–49. Dublin: Four Courts Press. ISBN 1-85182-400-6.
- Kenyon, J.; Ohlmeyer, J. H. (1998). The Civil Wars: A Military History of England, Scotland and Ireland, 1638–1660. Oxford University Press. ISBN 0-19280-278-X.
- Senior, Clive M. (1976). A Nation of Pirates. Newton Abbot: David & Charles. ISBN 0-7153-7264-5.
- Simms, J.G. (1969). Jacobite Ireland. Routledge & Kegan Paul, Limited. ISBN 0-71006-446-2.
- Simms, J.G. (1986). War and Politics in Ireland 1649–1730. Continuum International. ISBN 0826436099.
- Waudchope, Piers (1992). Patrick Sarsfield and the Williamite War. Dublin: Irish Academic Press. ISBN 0-71652-476-7.
- Wheeler, James Scott (1999). Cromwell in Ireland. St. Martin's Press. ISBN 0-31222-550-4.
