= Mark Talbot =

Irish Jacobite soldier (c. 1649–1702)

Mark (or Marcus) Talbot (c. 1649–1702) was an Irish soldier and politician. He was born in Ireland and served in the French army during a time when Irish Catholics were prohibited from serving in the Irish and English armies. His father rose in prominence during the reign of the Catholic James II of Ireland, who purged Protestants from the military and replaced them with Catholics.

During this time of upheaval that Mark Talbot became a lieutenant colonel in 1689. He served as a commander at Carrickfergus during a Protestant uprising against King James, and on the side of Jacobites in subsequent conflicts. For his efforts, he was promoted to brigadier in 1691, and served as a Member of Parliament for Belfast.

== Early life ==
He was born in Ireland at some point during the Irish Confederate Wars, the illegitimate son of the Irish soldier and courtier Richard Talbot. His father was from a long-established family of Catholic Palesman. His mother is unknown, but is thought to be a member of the O'Neills of Shane's Castle in County Antrim. Richard Talbot had connections to the family, and Mark retained strong links with the area.

During the reign of Charles II Talbot saw service in the French Army, as many Irish Catholics did during the era when the Penal laws forbade them from serving in either the Irish Army or English Army.

After 1685 his father had gained power in Ireland following the coming to the throne of the Catholic James II. He oversaw a rapid purge of Protestant officers in the Irish Army, replacing them with Catholics. Mark Talbot was one of those who benefited and he became a lieutenant colonel in the Earl of Antrim's Regiment in 1689. While many of the replacement officers were inexperienced, Mark was part of a group of veterans of continental warfare that included Lawrence Dempsey and Patrick Sarsfield.

Talbot was appointed to command at Carrickfergus when a major rebellion broke out amongst Irish Protestants against King James' rule. He fought on the Jacobite side during the ensuing Williamite War in Ireland. When King James arrived and summoned the Patriot Parliament, Mark was selected as Member of Parliament for Belfast. Promoted to brigadier in 1691, he was badly wounded at the Battle of Aughrim.

Following the Treaty of Limerick he was part of the Flight of the Wild Geese who went into exile on the Continent, serving with the Irish forces of the French Army. He fought in Catalonia in 1692 and was present at the Italian Battle of Marsaglia in 1693. He was then appointed to command Clare's Regiment, which was intended to be part of a planned invasion of England in 1694.

Shortly afterwards Talbot ran into trouble due to his romantic involvement with Henrietta FitzJames, the widowed daughter of King James. The couple were close to getting married. Shortly afterwards he was imprisoned in the Bastille, allegedly after voicing critical views of James while drunk. Despite pleas from his former commanders Noailles and Vendôme, the French King Louis XIV had him cashiered. He was eventually reinstated as a colonel in the French Army following the outbreak of the War of the Spanish Succession. He was killed at the Battle of Luzzara in 1702.

Although he was his father's only son, he could not inherit the title of Earl of Tyrconnell because of his illegitimacy, and it went to one of his cousins after his father's death in 1691.

== Bibliography ==
- Childs, John. The Williamite Wars in Ireland. Bloomsbury Publishing, 2007.
- Lenihan, Padraig. The Last Cavalier: Richard Talbot (1631-91). University College Dublin Press, 2014.
