= Sir William Talbot, 1st Baronet =

Irish lawyer and politician (died 1634)

William Talbot

Member of Parliament for County Kildare
- In office 1613–1615
- Preceded by: William Sutton; Thomas Fitzmorris
- Succeeded by: Sir Nicholas Whyte; Maurice Eustace (Speaker)

Personal details
- Died: 16 March 1634 Ireland
- Spouse: Alison Netterville (married c. 1608)

Sir William Talbot, 1st Baronet (died 1634), was an Irish lawyer and politician. He sat as MP for County Kildare in the Parliament of 1613–1615 and was in 1628 one of the negotiators of the Graces. However, he is probably mainly remembered as the father of Richard Talbot, 1st Earl of Tyrconnell.

Family tree

Sir William Talbot with wife, parents, and other selected relatives. (Note: This family tree is based on the written genealogies of the earl of Tyrconnell, the barons Talbot of Malahide, and the baronets Talbot of Carton. Also see the lists of children in the text.)

Thomas; Talbot; Malahide	Katherine; Betagh
William; Malahide	Peter	Robert; Carton	Genet; FitzGerald
William; 1st Baronet d. 1634	Alison; Netterville
Robert; 2nd Baronet; 1608 – aft. 1670	Grace; Calvert	Garret	Margaret; Gaydon	Richard; 1st Earl; Tyrconnell c. 1625 – 1691
Richard d. 1703; Malahide	Frances d. 1718	William; 3rd Baronet c. 1643 – 1691	Anne; Nugent

Legend

XXX	Subject of the article	XXX	Talbot baronets of Carton	XXX	Earls of Tyrconnell

== Birth and origins ==
William was the son of Robert Talbot of Carton, County Kildare, and his wife Genet FitzGerald. His father was the third son of Thomas Talbot of Malahide, County Dublin. (Note: The text follows the majority view on his father, but Burke (1915), focussing on the lineage of the Talbots of Malahide, maintains that Robert, his likely father, died childless.) His father's family was Old English. The judge Sir Thomas Talbot (died 1487) was William's great-great-grandfather.

His mother was a daughter of Thomas fitz Bartholomew Fitzgerald.

== Early life ==
Talbot was educated in the law, and attained a leading position as a lawyer in Dublin. About 1603 he was appointed Recorder of Dublin, but, being a staunch Catholic, which was a bar to public office, he was soon afterwards removed from office for recusancy.

== Marriage and children ==
In or before 1608 Talbot married Alison, daughter of John Netterville of Castleton, County Meath.

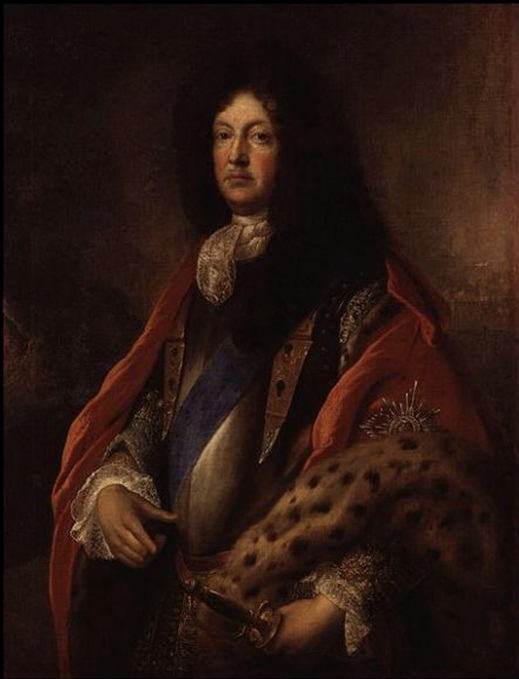
Tyrconnell, his 8th son

William and Alison had eight sons:

1. Robert (1608 – aft. 1670), his successor
2. John
3. Garret (died before May 1671), married Margaret Gaydon and was father of William, the 3rd baronet
4. James
5. Thomas, a Franciscan, chaplain to Queen Henrietta Maria
6. Peter (1618 – 1680), became Catholic Archbishop of Dublin
7. Gilbert, a Confederate officer, married Dorothy Boyle, widow of Adam Loftus and sister of Roger Boyle, Earl of Orrery
8. Richard (1630–1691), became Earl of Tyrconnell and Lord Lieutenant of Ireland during the reign of James II, overhauling the Royal Irish Army that then fought in the Williamite War

—and eight daughters:

1. Mary, married Sir John Dongan, 2nd Baronet, and had at least ten children, including Sir Walter Dongan, 3rd Baronet, William Dongan, 1st Earl of Limerick, and Thomas Dongan, 2nd Earl of Limerick
2. Bridget
3. Margaret (died 1662), married Sir Henry Talbot of Templeogue
4. Frances, married James Cusack, son of Edward Cusack and grandson of Sir Thomas Cusack, Lord Chancellor of Ireland, and had three sons, Thomas, William and Nicholas
5. Elizabeth
6. Jane
7. Catherine
8. Eleanor, married Sir Henry O'Neill, 1st Baronet, of Killelagh, and was the mother of Sir Neil O'Neill and of Rose O'Neill, a foster daughter and heir-at-law of Rose MacDonnell, Marchioness of Antrim

== Later life ==
=== Parliament of 1613–1615 ===
On 13 April 1613 Talbot was elected to the Irish Parliament 1613–1615 as MP for County Kildare, and became the unofficial legal adviser to the Roman Catholic party in the Irish House of Commons (they were a minority in the House, but a large one). Thomas Ryves, a close ally of the new Speaker, complained to the Westminster government that Talbot had abetted the return to Parliament of two schismatics. During the stormy scenes which marked the election of the speaker in the Irish House of Commons, culminating with one of the rival speakers (a fat man) sitting on the other, Talbot urged that the House should first purge itself of members elected by illegal means.

On 30 May 1613 Talbot was appointed by the House as one of the deputies to represent to James I the corrupt practices employed in the elections to secure a Protestant majority, and the arbitrary treatment of the Anglo-Irish Catholics. He crossed to England in July, and was examined by the Privy Council on his conduct in the Irish House of Commons. During the discussion of this question, Archbishop George Abbot demanded Talbot's opinion on a book (probably the Defensio fidei Catholicae adversus Anglicanae sectae errores) in which (he said) Francisco Suárez openly maintained the right of Catholics to kill a heretical king. Talbot hesitated, but acknowledged James I as the lawful king. The council was not satisfied with his answers, and on 17 July Talbot was committed to the Tower of London. On 13 November the Star Chamber sentenced him to a fine of £10,000. On 5 July 1614 Talbot was released and allowed to return to Ireland, and the fine was probably remitted. James I, on releasing him, disclaimed any intention of forcing the Irish Catholics to change their religion. From this time on Talbot became a supporter of the government, but took little part in politics.

=== Baronet ===
On 4 February 1623 Talbot was created a baronet and thus became Sir William. Subsequently, he received various grants of land.

=== The Graces ===
In 1628 Talbot travelled to England to see the new king Charles I as one of the 11 agents sent by the Irish to negotiate the Graces.

== Death ==
Talbot died on 16 March 1634 and was buried in Laraghbryan Cemetery outside Maynooth. He was succeeded by his eldest son Robert as the 2nd baronet.

== Notes and references ==
=== Sources ===
- Burke, Bernard (1883). A Genealogical History of the Dormant, Abeyant, Forfeited and Extinct Peerages of the British Empire (New ed.). London: Harrison. OCLC 499232768.
- Burke, Bernard; Fox-Davies, Arthur Charles (1912). A Genealogical and Heraldic History of the Landed Gentry of Ireland (New ed.). London: Harrison & Sons. OCLC 1045621157.
- Burke, Bernard; Burke, Ashworth P. (1915). A Genealogical and Heraldic History of the Peerage and Baronetage, the Privy Council, Knightage and Companionage (77th ed.). London: Harrison. OCLC 1155471554.
- Clavin, Terry (October 2009). "Talbot, Sir William". In McGuire, James; Quinn, James (eds.). Dictionary of Irish Biography (online ed.).
- Clarke, Aidan (October 2009). "Talbot, Peter". In McGuire, James; Quinn, James (eds.). Dictionary of Irish Biography (online ed.).
- Creighton, Anne (October 2009). "Talbot, Sir Robert". In McGuire, James; Quinn, James (eds.). Dictionary of Irish Biography (online ed.).
- Duignan, Aoife (October 2009). "Cusack, Nicholas". In McGuire, James; Quinn, James (eds.). Dictionary of Irish Biography (online ed.).
- G. E. C. (1896). Complete Peerage of England, Scotland, Ireland, Great Britain and the United Kingdom, Extant, Extinct, or Dormant. Vol. VII (1st ed.). London: George Bell and Sons. OCLC 1180891114. – S to T
- G. E. C. (1900). Complete Baronetage, 1611 to 1800. Vol. I (1st ed.). Exeter: William Pollard & Co. OCLC 866278985. – 1611 to 1625
- G. E. C. (1904). Complete Baronetage, 1611 to 1800. Vol. IV (1st ed.). Exeter: William Pollard & Co. OCLC 866278985. – 1665 to 1707 (for daughter Eleanor)
- House of Commons (1878). Return. Members of Parliament – Part II. Parliaments of Great Britain, 1705–1796. Parliaments of the United Kingdom, 1801–1874. Parliaments and Conventions of the Estates of Scotland, 1357–1707. Parliaments of Ireland, 1599–1800. London: His/Her Majesty's Stationery Office. OCLC 13112546.
- McGuire, James (October 2009). "Talbot, Richard". In McGuire, James; Quinn, James (eds.). Dictionary of Irish Biography (online ed.).
- Pollard, Albert Frederick (1898). "Talbot, Sir William (d. 1633)". In Lee, Sidney (ed.). Dictionary of National Biography. Vol. LV. London: Smith, Elder, & Co. pp. 338–339. OCLC 8544105.
- Pollard, Albert Frederick; Kelsey, Sean (2004). "Talbot, William, first baronet (d.1634)". In Matthew, H. C. G.; Harrison, Brian (eds.). Oxford Dictionary of National Biography. Vol. 53. New York: Oxford University Press. pp. 717–722. ISBN 0-19-861403-9.

Baronetage of Ireland
New creation	Baronet (of Carton); 1623–1634	Succeeded by Robert Talbot
