= Patrick Russell (bishop) =

Irish Roman Catholic prelate

- Archbishop of Dublin
- Church: Catholic Church
- Archdiocese: Archdiocese of Dublin
- In office: 2 August 1683 – 14 July 1692
- Predecessor: Peter Talbot
- Successor: Peter Creagh

Orders
- Ordination: 7 June 1654

Personal details
- Born: 1629 Rush, County Dublin, Kingdom of Ireland
- Died: 14 July 1692 (aged 62–63) Dublin, County Dublin, Kingdom of Ireland

Patrick Russell (1629 – 14 July 1692) was an Irish Roman Catholic prelate. He was Archbishop of Dublin from August 1683 until his death, having been imprisoned owing to his support for Jacobitism.

== Biography ==
Russell was a native of Rush, County Dublin, the son of James Russell. He was educated at the Irish College at Lisbon where he was ordained in 1654. Returning to Ireland he served in the parish of Church of St Nicholas of Myra Without, Dublin, and was made vicar general of the diocese in 1675. Following Archbishop Peter Talbot arrest in 1678 and death in 1680 during the Popish Plot, Russell assumed responsibility for the Archdiocese of Dublin. His own elevation to the archbishopric by Pope Innocent XI was dated 2 August 1683.

The suspension of the Penal Laws following the accession of James II of England enabled Russell to reorganise the church within the archdiocese. He convened two provincial assemblies in 1685 and 1688 and three diocesan synods in 1686, 1688, and 1689. In July 1685 he signed the petition presented by the catholic hierarchy of Ireland to James II asking him to empower the Earl of Tyrconnell to protect them in the exercise of their ministry. James II gave Russell a pension of £200 per year. Upon the king's arrival in Dublin in March 1689 following the Glorious Revolution, Russell led several services in James' presence.

After the Jacobite defeat at the Battle of the Boyne, Russell fled Ireland to join the exiled Jacobite court at Château de Saint-Germain-en-Laye. He returned to Ireland in secret in 1692, but was captured and imprisoned in Dublin Castle, where he died in July of that year during his trial.

A Compendium of Irish Biography (1878) says of him:

"He could with difficulty exercise his functions in public, and was frequently obliged to conceal himself amongst his relatives at Rush. After James II.'s accession he held several synods for arranging the shattered affairs of the Church, and through his influence the King was induced to settle £200 per annum out of the Irish revenues upon the Catholic bishops. During James's residence in Dublin the Archbishop took a prominent part in public affairs. After the battle of the Boyne he was tracked to his concealment in the country, and cast into prison, and lingered in a filthy underground cell until 14 July 1692, when death put an end to his sufferings."

Catholic Church titles
Preceded by Peter Talbot	Archbishop of Dublin; 1683–1692	Succeeded by Peter Creagh
