= Nicholas Cusack (Jacobite) =

Irish Jacobite politician

Colonel Nicholas Cusack (c.1638 – September 1726) was an Irish Jacobite politician and soldier.

Cusack was the third son of James Cusack of Cushinstown and Frances, daughter of Sir William Talbot, 1st Baronet and sister of Richard Talbot, 1st Earl of Tyrconnell. He was a great-grandson of Sir Thomas Cusack, Lord Chancellor of Ireland.

In 1683 he married Catherine Keating, daughter of Edward Keating of Narraghmore, County Kildare and Elizabeth Eustace, and widow of Adam Cusack, justice of the Court of Common Pleas (Ireland). Catherine died in 1699.

In 1688 he appears on a charter of James II of England as a burgess of Navan. In May 1689, he was elected as a Member of Parliament for Trim in the short-lived Patriot Parliament summoned by James II. His brother-in-law Chief Justice John Keating, the brother of his wife Catherine, played a prominent role in the Parliament.

During the Williamite War in Ireland, Cusack initially served as a captain in his uncle, Tyrconnell's, regiment of horse. He later became a Jacobite colonel. During the second Siege of Limerick, he was among the confidants of Patrick Sarsfield, 1st Earl of Lucan who encouraged the Jacobite commander to sue for peace. Following the surrender of Limerick, Cusack was appointed as one of the Jacobite commissioners tasked with negotiating terms with the Williamites, and he was one of the signatories of the Articles of Limerick on 3 October 1691. He was outlawed later that year and fled to France where he served in the Irish Brigade of the French Royal Army. He died at Château de Saint-Germain-en-Laye in 1726.

Parliament of Ireland
| Preceded by Henry Whitfield; Arthur Dillon | Member of Parliament for Trim; 1689; With: Walter Nangle | Succeeded by Stafford Lightbourne; Garret Wesley |
