= Sir Robert Talbot, 2nd Baronet =

Irish landowner, soldier and politician (born 1608)

Sir Robert Talbot, 2nd Baronet (1608 – after 1670) of Carton was an Irish landowner, soldier, and politician. He sat for County Wicklow in the Irish parliament 1634–1635.

Family tree

Robert Talbot with wife, parents, and other selected relatives. (Note: This family tree is based on the genealogy of the earl of Tyrconnell, the barons Talbots of Malahide, and the baronets Talbot of Carton. Also see the lists of children in the text.)

Robert; Talbot; Carton | Genet; FitzGerald
William; 1st Baronet; Talbot d. 1634 | Alison; Netterville
Robert; 2nd Baronet; 1608 – aft. 1670 | Grace; Calvert | Garret | Margaret; Gaydon | Richard; 1st Earl; Tyrconnell c. 1630 – 1691
Richard; Talbot d. 1703; Malahide | Frances d. 1718 | William; 3rd Baronet c. 1643 – 1691 | Anne; Nugent d. 1710
Richard d.v.p.* | Robert d.v.p.* | John d.v.p.* | Frances; Wogan

Legend

| XXX | Subject of the article | XXX | Talbot baronets of Carton | XXX | Earls of Tyrconnell |

*d.v.p. = predeceased his father (decessit vita patris)

== Birth and origins ==
Robert was born in 1608, the eldest son of William Talbot and his wife Alison Netterville. His father was the 1st Baronet Talbot of Carton, County Kildare. His father's family was Old English.

His mother was a daughter of John Netterville.

He was one of 16 siblings, who are listed in his father's article. Among his younger brothers were Peter Talbot, who became the Catholic Archbishop of Dublin, and the soldier and courtier Richard Talbot, whose career eventually eclipsed Robert's as Richard rose to become Lord Lieutenant of Ireland under James II and commanded the Royal Irish Army during the Williamite War.

Like most other Old English families, the Talbots and Nettervilles remained Roman Catholics after the Reformation.

== Marriage and children ==
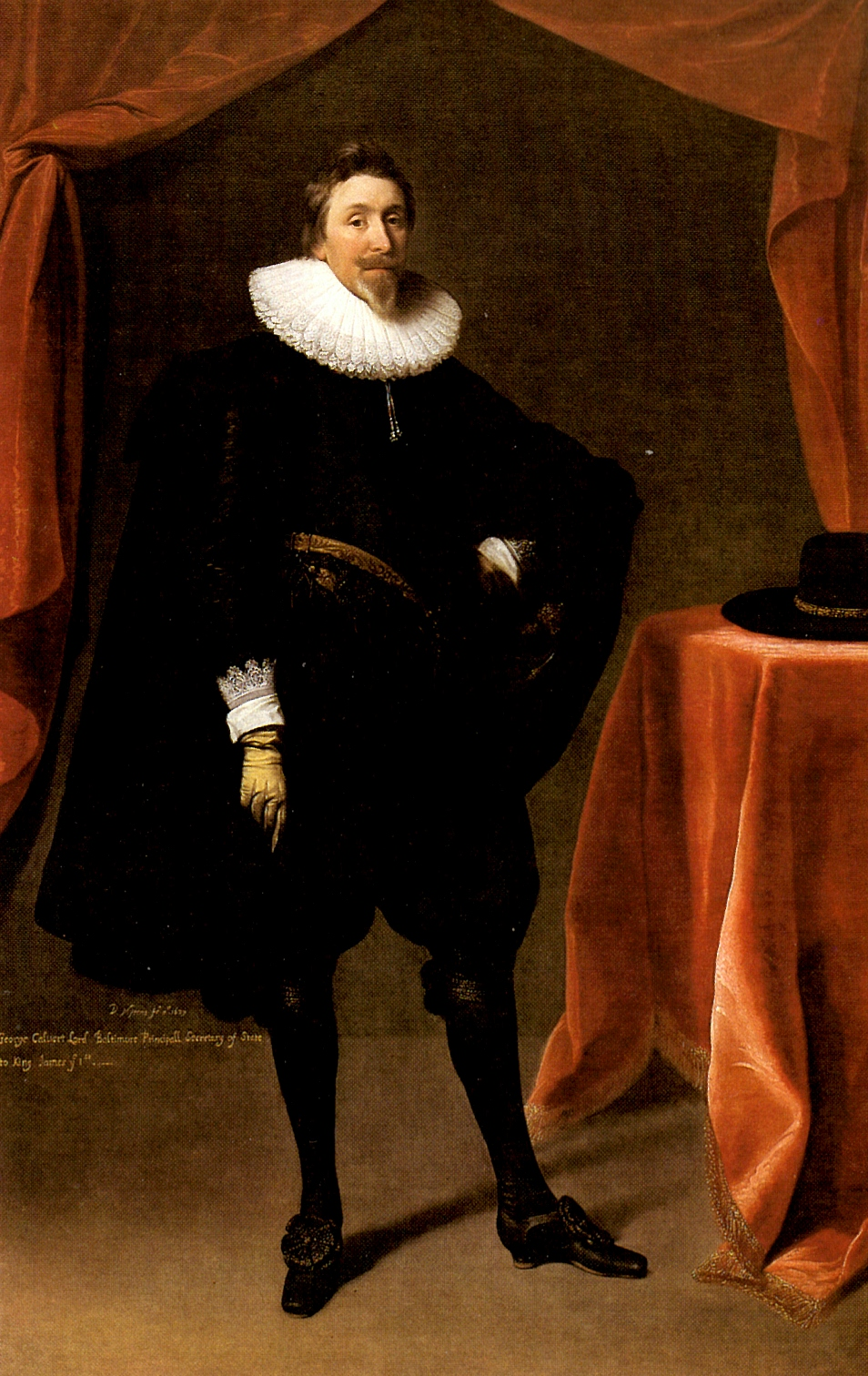
George Calvert, 1st Baron Baltimore, Robert's father-in-law

Talbot married Grace Calvert, the daughter of George Calvert, 1st Baron Baltimore, a leading English Catholic and founder of the Maryland Colony. Grace was one of thirteen children by his wife Anne Mynne or Mayne, daughter of George Mynne and Elizabeth Wroth.

Robert and Grace had a daughter:

1. Frances (died 1718) married her cousin Richard Talbot of Malahide

They lived at Castlesallagh, County Wicklow.

== Baronet ==
He succeeded his father as 2nd baronet Talbot of Carton on 16 March 1634.

== MP ==
On 10 June 1634 Talbot was elected MP for County Wicklow in the Parliament 1634–1635. He was expelled from parliament for lacking respect to Thomas Wentworth, Lord Deputy.

== Irish Confederate war and Cromwellian conquest ==
After the outbreak of the Irish Rebellion of 1641, Talbot joined the Irish Catholic Confederates and was a leading member of the Moderate Faction on the Supreme Council. He served as an officer in the Leinster Army. In July 1651, during the Cromwellian conquest of Ireland he was forced to surrender Athlone to the advancing English Republican forces under Charles Coote. His lands were forfeited at the defeat. Under the Act of Settlement 1662 he recovered most of his lands.

== Death and succession ==
In or after 1671, he died and was succeeded by his nephew Sir William Talbot, 3rd Baronet, who would be the last of the Carton baronets.

== Notes and references ==
=== Sources ===
- Burke, Bernard (1883). A Genealogical History of the Dormant, Abeyant, Forfeited and Extinct Peerages of the British Empire (New ed.). London: Harrison. OCLC 499232768.
- Burke, Bernard; Burke, Ashworth Peter (1915). A Genealogical and Heraldic History of the Peerage and Baronetage, the Privy Council, Knightage and Companionage (77th ed.). London: Harrison. OCLC 1155471554.
- Cokayne, George Edward (1900). Complete Baronetage, 1611 to 1800. Vol. I (1st ed.). Exeter: William Pollard & Co. OCLC 866278985. – 1611 to 1625
- Creighton, Anne (October 2009). McGuire, James; Quinn, James (eds.). "Talbot, Sir Robert". Dictionary of Irish Biography.
- House of Commons (1878). Return. Members of Parliament – Part II. Parliaments of Great Britain, 1705–1796. Parliaments of the United Kingdom, 1801–1874. Parliaments and Conventions of the Estates of Scotland, 1357–1707. Parliaments of Ireland, 1599–1800. London: His/Her Majesty's Stationery Office. OCLC 13112546.
- Lenihan, Pádraig (2014). The last Cavalier: Richard Talbot (1631–91). Dublin: University College of Dublin Press. ISBN 978-1-906359-83-6. – Does not seem to be available online
- Pollard, Albert Frederick; Kelsey, Sean (2004). "Talbot, William, first baronet (d.1634)". In Matthew, Colin; Harrison, Brian (eds.). Oxford Dictionary of National Biography. Vol. 53. New York: Oxford University Press. pp. 717–722. ISBN 0-19-861403-9.

Baronetage of Ireland
| Preceded by William Talbot | Baronet (of Carton); 1634–1670 | Succeeded by William Talbot |
