= Peter Creagh =

Irish Roman Catholic bishop

- Archbishop of Dublin
- Church: Catholic Church
- Archdiocese: Archdiocese of Dublin
- In office: 9 March 1693 – 25 July 1705
- Predecessor: Patrick Russell
- Successor: Edmund Byrne
- Previous post: Bishop of Cork and Cloyne (1676-1693)

Orders
- Ordination: 7 February 1666
- Consecration: 26 May 1676 by Ulderico Carpegna

Personal details
- Born: 25 July 1642 Carrigeen, Kilbehenny, County Limerick, Kingdom of Ireland
- Died: 25 July 1705 (aged 63) Strasbourg, Province of Alsace, Kingdom of France

Peter Creagh or Piers Crevens (born Carrigeen 25 July 1642; died Strasbourg 25 July 1705) was an Irish Roman Catholic bishop in the late 17th and early 18th centuries.

== Life ==
Creagh was educated at the Jesuit college in Poitiers and in 1660 went on to the Pontifical Irish College in Rome, where was awarded a doctorate. He was ordained priest in February 1666, served on the mission in Ireland for three years, and then became the agent of the Irish bishops in Rome. He spoke Italian, Latin, French, English, and Irish. In 1671 Oliver Plunkett described him as of average height with a long oval face and reddish brown hair and beard.

Creagh was consecrated Bishop of Cork and Cloyne on 27 May 1676 at the church of St Isidore in Rome. During the Popish Plot scare orchestrated by Titus Oates he was arrested in March 1680 and spent two years in prison on suspicion of conspiring to murder Charles II of England, before being acquitted in August 1682. During the trial the courthouse roof collapsed on his accusers, narrowly missing the judge, but leaving Creagh unscathed.

He left Ireland after the defeat of James II of England in 1690. In 1693 he was translated to the Archbishopric of Dublin on the recommendation of King James, but he was never able to return to Ireland to claim the see. He became Coadjutor Bishop of Strasbourg, where he died on 25 July 1705.

== Notes ==
Catholic Church titles
| Preceded by See vacant | Bishop of Cork and Cloyne; 1676–1693 | Succeeded by John Sleyne |
| Preceded by Patrick Russell | Archbishop of Dublin; 1693–1705 | Succeeded by Edmund Byrne |
