= Laraghbryan =

Old monastic settlement and graveyard in County Kildare, Ireland

Coordinates: 53.3818°N 6.6138°W

Laraghbryan (Irish: Láithreach Briúin) is the site of an old monastic settlement, cemetery and ruined church, 1 kilometre (0.6 mi) west of Maynooth, County Kildare, Ireland. It is in a civil parish of the same name.

It is the site of a graveyard which is in use by the Roman Catholic Parish of Maynooth. The ruined church consists of a nave and chancel with a tower attached, most of the ruined structure was part of a church built in Norman times, however this church was built on the site of a previous ecclesiastical settlement.

In 1770 when the first Duke of Leinster restored Saint Mary's Church of Ireland in Maynooth, the wooden East Window was removed from Laraghbryan and installed in Saint Mary's, where it is today.

== Laraghbryan Cemetery ==
While most of the burials in the graveyard were from the 19th century, in the 20th century, usage was increased by the development of the Maynooth parish. There is a wall separating the old graveyard and new cemetery, however, burials still take place in the old graveyard. Prior to the opening of the College Cemetery in Maynooth, in 1817, a number of professors of the college were buried here: Rev. Charles Lovelock A.M., Rev Clotworthy Augustine McCormick (d 1807) and Rev Edward Ferris DD.

The Baronet Sir William Talbot BL, MP (for Meath 1613–1615) and a freeman of Dublin, was buried here in 1634.

Domhnall Ua Buachalla, the last Governor-General of the Irish Free State (1932–36), was buried here in 1963.
