= The Graces (Ireland) =

Rights sold to the Irish nobility in the 17th century

The Graces were a series of reforms sought by Catholics in Ireland in 1628–1634. Since the introduction of the Reformation in Ireland, based on the English model and directed by the English Crown, the rights of the Catholic majority in the Kingdom of Ireland had been curtailed. A number of influential Catholics in the Parliament of Ireland (both Old English and members of the Gaelic nobility of Ireland) sought to redress this during the reign of King Charles I by proposing reforms to allow Catholics loyal to the Crown to play their full role in Irish society, both legally and officially. Although the King was sympathetic, during the time of Thomas Wentworth, who was the Lord Deputy of Ireland from 1632 to 1640, these aims were frustrated. The discontent resulting from the lack of reform played a part in the outbreak of the Irish Rebellion of 1641.

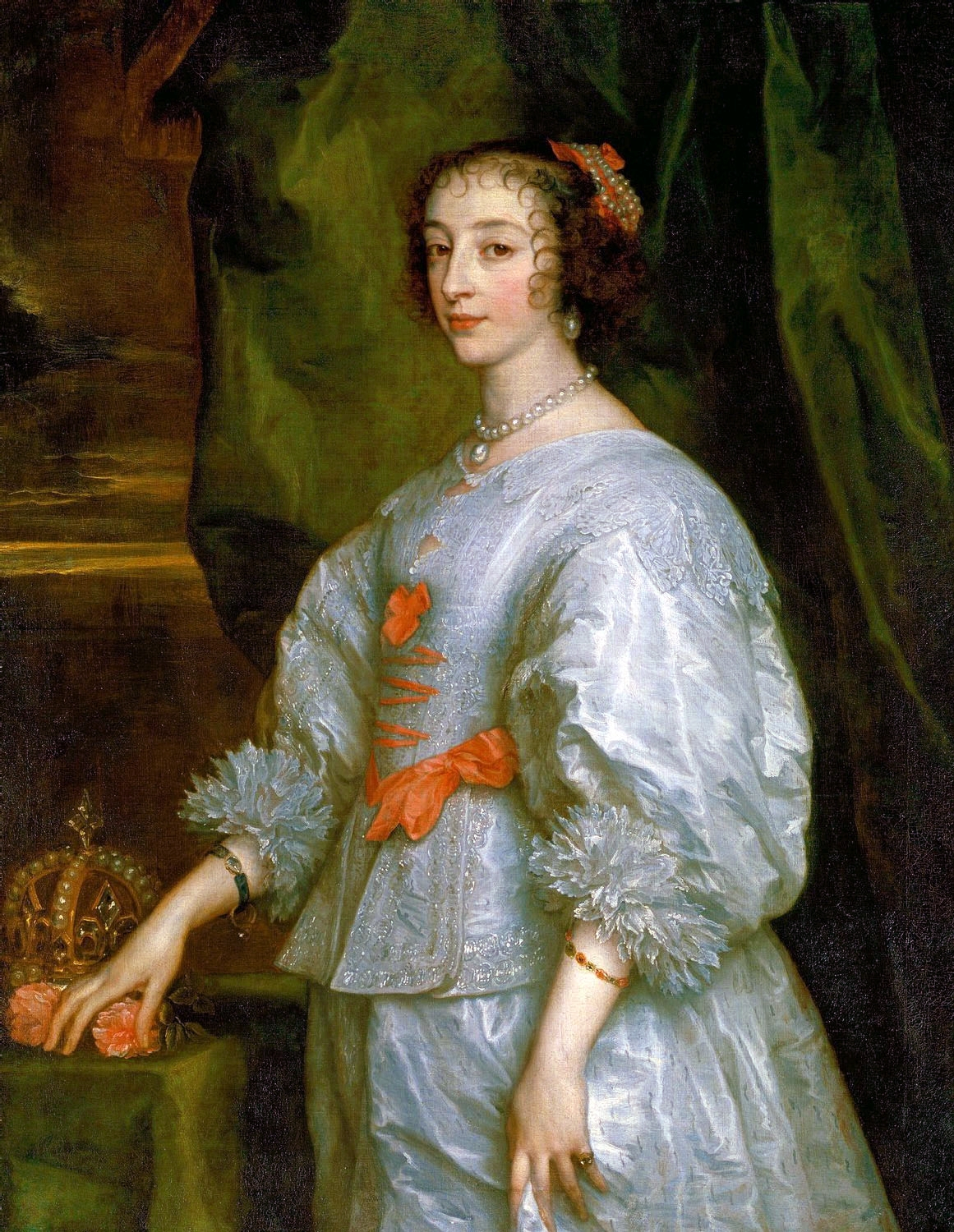
Queen-consort Henrietta Maria, the Catholic wife of King Charles I

== Background ==
The Anglo-Spanish War (1625–1630) forced Charles I of England to maintain troops in Ireland to defend the country against a possible Spanish invasion. Despite the introduction of the Reformation by Henry VIII of England, most people in the Kingdom of Ireland had remained Catholic. On the accession of King Charles I in 1625, whose queen was the French Catholic princess Henrietta Maria, many Catholics expected the new king to be more favourable to their religion. The wealthier Catholics who sat in the Irish House of Lords and the Irish House of Commons formed a committee in which participated Luke Plunket, 10th Baron of Killeen and Sir William Talbot, 1st Baronet. That committee petitioned the king to have anti-Catholic legislation removed.

== Negotiation ==
King Charles I had indicated in 1626 that he would concede certain rights to the Irish Catholics and Irish landlords in general if paid well enough.

In June 1627 a convention was elected that chose 11 agents to be sent to England to negotiate with the King. Three were Protestants, the remaining eight Old English Catholics. They were:

- Lord Killeen
- Sir Thomas Lutrell
- Sir William Talbot, 1st Baronet
- Sir Lucas Dillon
- Sir Henry Lynch, 1st Baronet
- Sir Edward FitzHarris
- Sir John Meade
- Lord Power
- Richard Osborne
- Arthur Forbes
- Andrew Stewart

At Whitehall in 1628 the King and the Irish delegation agreed on 51 articles. These concessions are known as the Graces because the agreement was entitled "Matters of Grace and Bounty". At the core of the Graces were land rights and religious freedom. The payment was fixed at £120,000 sterling (about £28,000,000 in 2025) in three yearly instalments. The Graces had been proclaimed, and a first instalment had been paid.

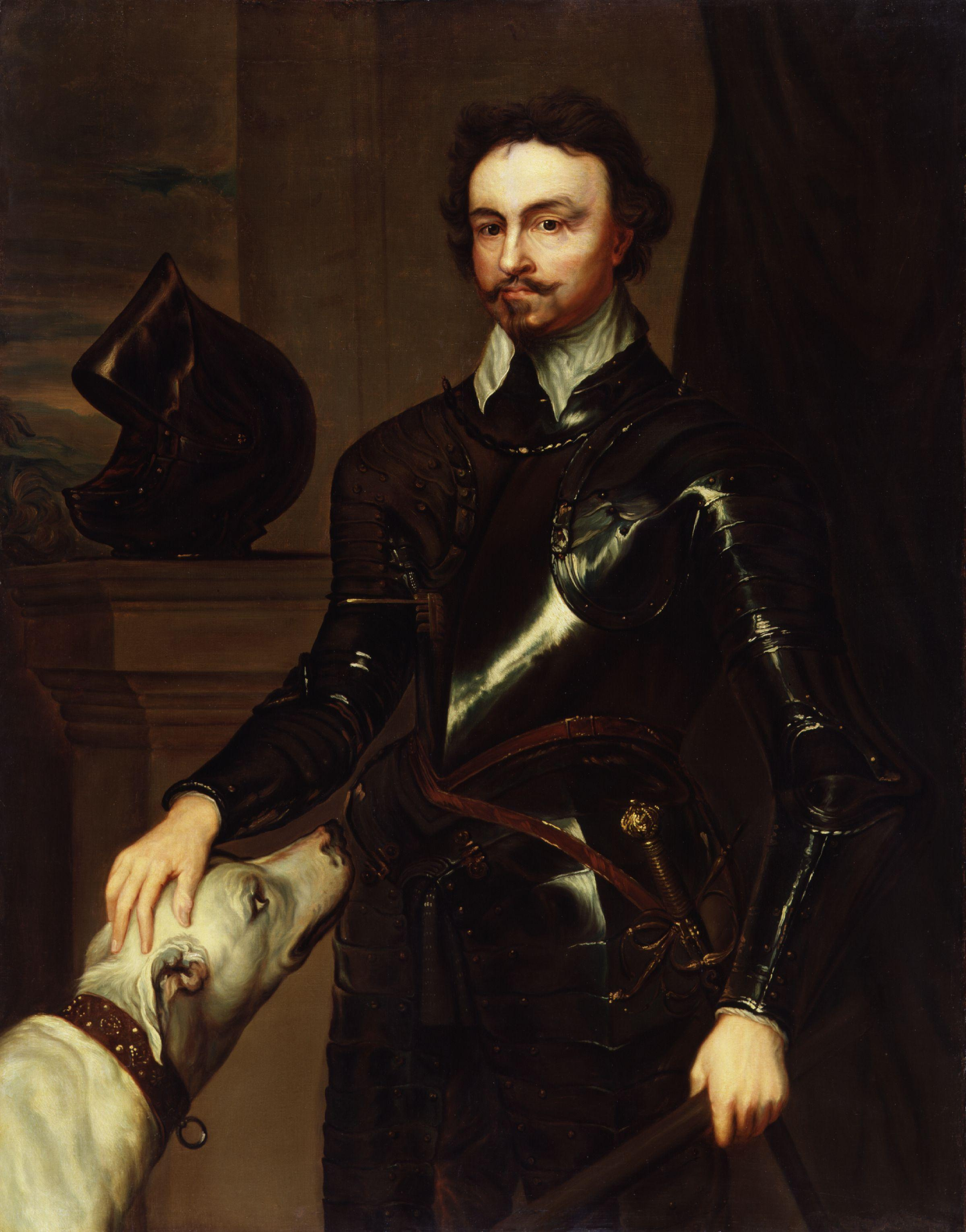
Thomas Wentworth, 1st Earl of Strafford, c. 1639

== Incomplete ratification ==
The Irish Parliament should have ratified the Graces promptly, but the Lord Deputy Lord Falkland never summoned the parliament needed for this purpose. The parliament called in 1634 was the first Irish parliament since the proclamation of the Graces. The Irish therefore expected to see them confirmed in this parliament, while Wentworth expected trouble when he refused.

The Irish parliament next sat in late 1634 and the order of business was led by Thomas Wentworth who had been Lord Deputy of Ireland since 1632. Wentworth's priority was to make Ireland profitable for Charles, and the first items on the agenda were supply bills that were passed without dissent. The Catholic members had all agreed to the new taxes on the understanding that their Graces—by now in form of a list of 51 articles—would be passed in the second session from 4 November to 14 December. The Catholic MPs in the Commons briefly had a majority caused by the absence of some Protestant MPs, and this increased their hopes that all the Graces would be enacted.

On 27 November Wentworth refused to allow two of the Graces. These were to extend the English statute of limitations to Ireland (then 70 years), and to guarantee the titles of the current landowners in Connacht, a province where the great majority of landlords were Catholic. Consequently, the subsequent bills introduced by Wentworth were all opposed by the Catholic members. The Graces were shelved despite further representations to Charles.

On 16 December Wentworth wrote as follows to Edward Coke in London:

"The Popish Party have been ill to please this Session, but after I had the 27th of last Month given our Answer to their Graces, they lost all Temper ..."

Historians disagreed to what extent Wentworth's letters on the 1634 session reflect reality, or whether they were an unduly boastful and selective account to his colleagues in London. Given the few opportunities for parliamentary sessions at that time, debate also continues on whether or not the Catholic parliamentarians were unduly inflexible; they should perhaps have accepted 49 out of the 51 Graces in 1634, and then campaigned in London to try to secure the last two.

== Outcomes ==
The hopes dashed by the matter of the Graces were compounded by Wentworth's subsequent policies in Ireland. Particularly, he then challenged the freehold titles of many Old English families in Connacht that could be rectified only by the payment of large fines. The ensuing ill-feeling contributed in part to the Irish Rebellion of 1641 and the establishment of Confederate Ireland that led on, ultimately, to the Cromwellian conquest of Ireland in 1649–53. For English political reasons, Wentworth was tried by parliament and executed in May 1641.

Following Wentworth's attainder in April 1641, King Charles and the Privy Council of England instructed the Irish Lords Justices on 3 May 1641 to publish the required Bills to enact the Graces. However, the law reforms were not properly implemented before the rebellion in late 1641.

== See also ==
- Early Modern Ireland 1536–1691
- Catholic emancipation
- Penal Laws

== Sources ==
- Carte, Thomas (1851) [1st pub. 1736]. The Life of James Duke of Ormond. Vol. I (New ed.). Oxford: Oxford University Press. OCLC 1086656347. – 1613 to 1641
- Clarke, Aidan; Fenlon, D. B. (1967). "Two Notes on the Parliament of 1634". The Journal of the Royal Society of Antiquaries of Ireland. 97: 85–90.
- Clarke, Aidan (1976). "Chapter VIII: Selling Royal Favours, 1624–32". In Moody, Theodore William; Martin, F. X.; Byrne, Francis John (eds.). A New History of Ireland. Vol. III. Oxford: Oxford University Press. pp. 233–242. ISBN 0-19-820242-3. – 1624 to 1632
- Cusack, Mary Frances (1871). A Compendium of Irish History. Boston: Patrick Donahoe. OCLC 873009963.
- Duffy, Seán (2002). The Illustrated History of Ireland. New York: Contemporary Books. ISBN 0-8092-2437-2.
- Fenlon, Dermot B. (1964). "Wentworth and the Parliament of 1634: An Essay in Chronology". Journal of the Royal Society of Antiquaries of Ireland. 94 (2): 159–175. JSTOR 25509568.
- Gardiner, Samuel Rawson (1899). "Wentworth, Thomas, first Earl of Strafford (1593–1641)". In Lee, Sidney (ed.). Dictionary of National Biography. Vol. LX. London: Smith, Elder, & Co. pp. 268–283. OCLC 8544105.
- Gillespie, Raymond (2006). Seventeenth-Century Ireland: Making Ireland Modern. Dublin: Gill & MacMillan. ISBN 978-0-7171-3946-0.
- Joyce, Patrick Weston (1903). A Concise History of Ireland from the Earliest Times to 1837 (12th ed.). Dublin: M. H. Gill & Son. OCLC 815623752.
- Kelsey, Sean (2004). "Cary, Henry, first viscount Falkland". In Matthew, Henry Colin Gray; Harrison, Brian (eds.). Oxford Dictionary of National Biography. Vol. 10. New York: Oxford University Press. pp. 430–432. ISBN 0-19-861360-1.
- Pollard, Albert Frederick; Kelsey, Sean (2004). "Talbot, William, first baronet (d.1634)". In Matthew, Colin; Harrison, Brian (eds.). Oxford Dictionary of National Biography. Vol. 53. New York: Oxford University Press. pp. 717–722. ISBN 0-19-861403-9.
- Wallace, Martin (1973). A Short History of Ireland. Newton Abbot, Devon: David & Charles. ISBN 978-0-7153-6306-5.
