= Walter Nangle =

Irish politician and soldier (c.1630 – 1693)

Walter Nangle (c.1630 – 1693) was an Irish Jacobite politician and soldier.

Nangle was the son of Jocelyn Nangle and Elinor Cusack. In 1689, he was elected as a Member of Parliament for Trim in the short-lived Patriot Parliament summoned by James II of England. During the Williamite War in Ireland, he was a captain in King James' Regiment of Infantry. He was attainted in 1691, forfeiting his 668-acre estate in County Meath.

Parliament of Ireland
Preceded by Henry Whitfield; Arthur Dillon	Member of Parliament for Trim; 1689; With: Nicholas Cusack	Succeeded by Stafford Lightbourne; Garret Wesley
