= Treaty of Limerick =

1691 treaty ending war in Ireland

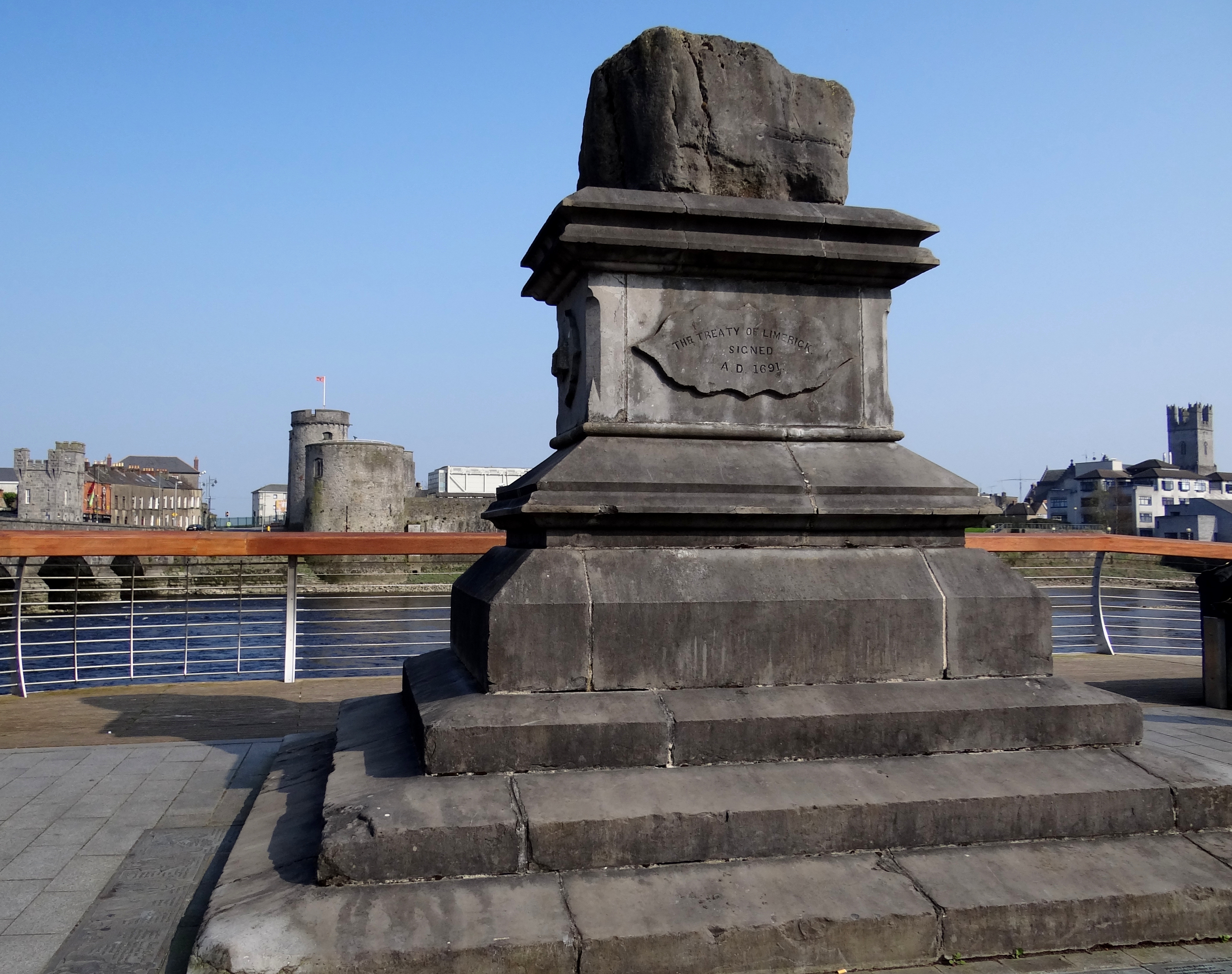
- The Treaty Stone, reputedly the location of the treaty signing.
- Signed: 3 October 1691
- Location: Limerick
- Original signatories: Civil Articles: (Kingdom of Ireland) Sir Charles Porter; (Kingdom of Ireland) Sir Thomas Coningsby; (Dutch Republic) Baron de Ginkell; Earl of Lucan; Viscount Galmoye; Sir Toby Butler; Nicholas Purcell; Garrett Dillon; Military Articles: (Dutch Republic) Baron de Ginkell; (Kingdom of France) de Tessé; (Kingdom of France) D'Usson; (Kingdom of France) Latour Monfort; Earl of Lucan; Viscount Galmoye; Mark Talbot; Nicholas Purcell
- Parties: Ireland; Jacobites
- Languages: English

The Treaty of Limerick (Irish: Conradh Luimnigh), signed on 3 October 1691, ended the Williamite War in Ireland, a conflict related to the Nine Years' War (1688–1697). It consisted of two separate agreements, one with military terms of surrender, signed by commanders of a French expeditionary force and Irish Jacobites loyal to the exiled James II. Lieutenant-General de Ginkell, leader of government forces in Ireland, signed on behalf of William III and his wife Mary II. It allowed Jacobite units to be transported to France, the diaspora known as the Flight of the Wild Geese.

The other set out conditions for those who remained, including guarantees of religious freedom for Catholics, and retention of property for those who remained in Ireland. Many were subsequently altered or ignored, establishing the Protestant Ascendancy that dominated Ireland until the Catholic emancipation in the first half of the 19th century.

== Background ==
The 1690/1691 campaigns; key locations

William's victory at the Battle of Boyne in July 1690 was less decisive than appeared at the time, Jacobite losses being around 2,000 out of a force of 25,000. That assumption formed the basis of the Declaration of Finglas, largely dictated by Irish Protestants; it offered the Jacobite rank and file amnesty, but by excluding senior officers, threatened another round of land confiscations. The war continued, with French victories in the Low Countries briefly increasing hopes of a Stuart restoration.

The Jacobites established a defensive line along the Shannon, and repulsed attempts to capture Limerick and Athlone. However, Connacht and County Kerry could not feed an additional 20,000 soldiers, plus refugees, while the loss of the south-western ports of Kinsale and Cork made resupply from France extremely difficult. By the spring of 1691, both soldiers and civilians were starving.

Although the English Parliament was divided politically, all parties broadly agreed on the need to re-establishing the pre-1685 settlement. In fact, Parliament wanted more resources dedicated to Ireland than William, who viewed it as secondary to the war in Europe. In 1691, French preparations for an offensive in the Low Countries led William to authorise De Ginkell to offer whatever terms were necessary to make peace. This caused much conflict later on.

Jacobite strategy was impacted by internal divisions. James II saw Ireland as a distraction, a perspective shared by many of the English and Scots exiles. For the French, it was a way to divert Williamite resources, and their approach was purely military. After the Boyne, they recommended Dublin be destroyed, and argued Limerick should not be defended; they withdrew to Galway in September 1690, and many of their troops returned to France.

The Irish Jacobites were broadly divided into a pro-war faction, headed by Sarsfield, who argued military victory was still possible, and those led by Tyrconnell, who advocated negotiating peace while they still retained an army. In May, a French convoy reached Limerick with additional French troops, arms and provisions but lack of transport meant most of it remained in the port.

== Military articles ==
These articles dealt with the treatment of the disbanded Jacobite army. Under the treaty, Jacobite soldiers in formed regiments had the option to leave with their arms and flags for France to continue serving under James II in the Irish Brigade. Some 14,000 Jacobites chose this option and were marched south to Cork where they embarked on ships for France, many of them accompanied by their wives and children. Individual soldiers wanting to join the French, Spanish or Austrian armies also emigrated in what became known as the Flight of the Wild Geese.

The Jacobite soldiers also had the option of joining the Williamite army. 1,000 soldiers chose this option. The Jacobite soldiers thirdly had the option of returning home which some 2,000 soldiers chose.

This treaty had twenty-nine articles, which were agreed upon between Lieutenant-General Ginkell, Commander-in-Chief of the English army, and the Lieutenant-Generals D'Usson and de Tessé, Commanders-in-Chief of the Irish army. The articles were signed by D'Usson, Le Chevalier de Tesse, Latour Montfort, Patrick Sarsfield (Earl of Lucan), Colonel Nicholas Purcell of Loughmoe, Mark Talbot, and Piers, Viscount Galmoy.

== Civil articles ==
These articles protected the rights of the defeated Jacobite landed gentry and merchants who chose to remain in Ireland, most of whom were Catholics. Their property was not to be confiscated so long as they swore allegiance to William III and Mary II, and Catholic noblemen were to be allowed to bear arms. Four were included by name: Colonel Lutterel, Captain Rowland White, Maurice Eustace of Yeomanstown, and Chievers of Maystown commonly called Mount Leinster. William required peace in Ireland and was allied to the Papacy in 1691 within the League of Augsburg.

This Treaty contained thirteen articles which were agreed upon, on the Williamite side, by the Lords Justices of Ireland — Sir Charles Porter and Thomas Coningsby, 1st Earl Coningsby — and the Commander-in-Chief, Baron de Ginkell; and on the Jacobite side by Patrick Sarsfield, 1st Earl of Lucan; Piers Butler, 3rd Viscount Galmoye; Colonels Nicholas Purcell of Loughmoe, Nicholas Cusack, Garrett Dillon, and John Brown; and Sir Toby Butler, who was the actual draftsman. The treaty was signed by Porter, Coningsby, and de Ginkel, and witnessed by Scavenmoer, H. Mackay, and T. Talmash.

It has been said that "the ink was not dry on the Treaty" before the English broke it—the civil articles were not honoured by the victorious Williamite government. The few Catholic landowners who took the oath in 1691–93 remained protected, including their descendants. Those who did not were known as "non-jurors", and their loyalty to the new regime was automatically suspect. Some managed to have outlawry specifically reversed, such as the 8th Viscount Dillon in 1694, or the Earl of Clanricarde in 1701.

The Papacy again recognized James II as the lawful king of Ireland from 1693. From 1695 this provoked a series of harsh penal laws to be enacted by the Parliament of Ireland, to make it difficult for the Irish Catholic gentry who had not taken the oath by 1695 to remain Catholic. The laws were extended for political reasons by the Dublin administration during the War of the Spanish Succession (1701–14), and reforms did not start until the 1770s.

Limerick was not the only treaty signed between the Jacobites and the Williamites. A similar treaty had been signed on the surrender of Galway on 22 July 1691, but without the strict loyalty oath required under the Treaty of Limerick. The Galway garrison had been organised by the largely Catholic landed gentry of counties Galway and Mayo, who benefited from their property guarantees in the following century. The Limerick treaty marked the end of the war.

== Williamite settlement forfeitures ==
In the following 8 years further confiscations were made from the continuing adherents to the Jacobite cause, and also further pardons were granted. The Commissioners of Forfeitures reported to the Irish House of Commons in December 1699 as follows:

- 3,921 named persons had been outlawed initially, who owned
- 1,060,792 acres (4,293 km^{2}) of land, (about 1/20 of the land area of Ireland)
  - that produced rents of £211,623 a year, and were worth £4,685,130 10s

Of these,

- 491 had been pardoned in accord with the treaties at Cavan and Limerick, and 792 otherwise; Some of the remaining 2,638 persons or their families had had property restored.
- Ultimately the total amount received by the Commissioners was: 752,953 acres (3,047 km^{2}) paying rents of £135,793 p.a., worth £1,699,343. A further £300,000 in chattels and £1,092,000 of forestry had been seized, along with several hundred individual houses.

== See also ==
- History of Limerick
- List of treaties
- Battle of the Boyne
- Irish of Nantes

== Sources ==
- Childs, John (2008). The Williamite Wars in Ireland. Bloomsbury 3PL. ISBN 978-1847251640.
- Connolly, SJ (2008). Divided Kingdom: Ireland 1630-1800. OUP. ISBN 978-0199543472.
- Lenihan, Padraig (2003). 1690; Battle of the Boyne. The History Press Ltd. ISBN 978-0752425979.
- Lenihan, Maurice (1866), Limerick; Its History and Antiquities, Ecclesiastical, Civil, and Military: From the Earliest Ages, with Copious Historical, Archaeological, Topographical, and Genealogical Notes, Hodges, Smith, and Company, p. 286
