= Peter Talbot (bishop) =

Irish Roman Catholic archbishop (1618–1680)

The Most Reverend Peter Talbot
- Archbishop of Dublin
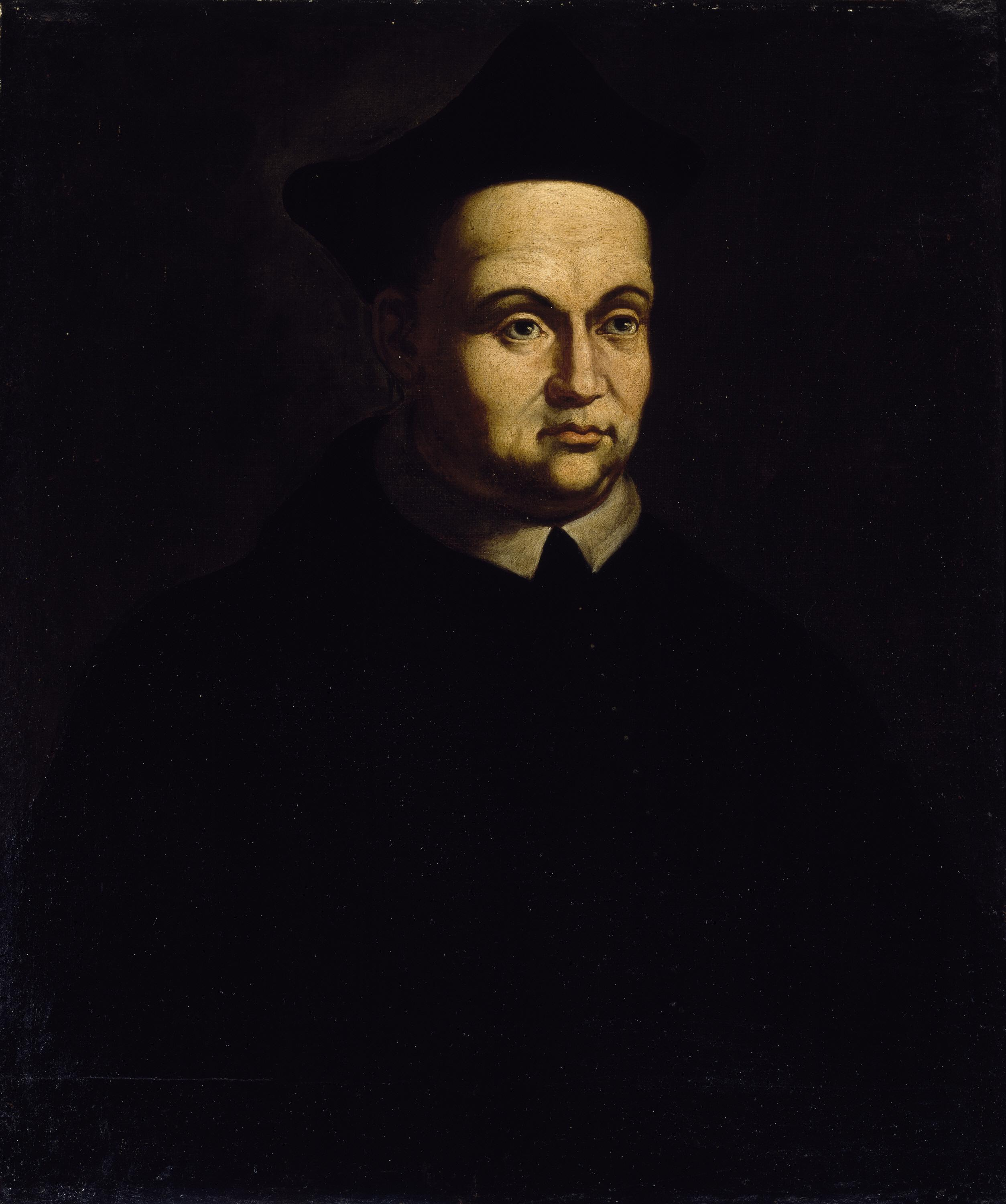
- Portrait of Peter Talbot, c. 1660, located in Malahide Castle
- Church: Catholic Church
- Archdiocese: Archdiocese of Dublin
- Appointed: 1669

Orders
- Ordination: c. 1647
- Consecration: 9 May 1669

Personal details
- Born: 29 June 1618 Malahide, County Dublin, Ireland
- Died: 15 November 1680 (aged 62) Dublin Castle, Dublin, Ireland

Peter Talbot (29 June 1618 – 15 November 1680) was an Irish Roman Catholic religious leader who served as Archbishop of Dublin from 1669 until his death in prison in 1680. He was a victim of the Popish Plot.

== Early life ==
Talbot was born at Malahide on 29 June 1618 to Sir William Talbot and his wife Alison (née Netterville). In May 1635, he entered the Society of Jesus in Portugal. He was ordained a priest at Rome on either 6 April 1647 or 6 June 1648.

According to archbishop Oliver Plunkett, Talbot proved "so troublesome" that he was made to carry out the tertian stage of his probation in Florence.

Talbot held the chair of theology at the College of Antwerp. In the meantime during the Commonwealth period, Charles II and the royal family were compelled to seek refuge in Europe. Throughout the period of the king's exile, Talbot's brothers were attached to the royal court. The eldest brother, Sir Robert Talbot, 2nd Baronet, had held a high commission under James Butler, 1st Duke of Ormond in the army in Ireland and was reckoned among the king's most confidential advisers. A younger brother, Richard Talbot, later 1st Earl of Tyrconnell, was also devoted to the cause of the exiled monarch and stood high in royal favour.

== Appointments ==
Peter Talbot himself was constantly in attendance on Charles II and his court. On account of his knowledge of the continental languages, he was repeatedly dispatched to private embassies in Lisbon, Madrid, and Paris. On the return of the king to London, Talbot received an appointment as Queen's Almoner, but the Clarendon and Ormond faction, which was then predominant, feared his influence with the king. He was accused of conspiring with four Jesuits to assassinate the Duke of Ormond, and he was forced to seek safety by resigning his position at Court and retiring to continent Europe. The king allowed him a pension of three hundred pounds a year. Before his return to England, Talbot had, with the approval of the General of the Jesuits, severed his connection with the Society.

He was appointed Archbishop of Dublin in 1669. Sources differ on the exact date – 11 January, 8 March or 2 May. Talbot was consecrated in Antwerp on 9 May 1669, assisted by the Bishops of Ghent and Ferns.

== Catholic persecution ==
During this period, the English treatment of Catholics in Ireland was more lenient than usual, owing to the known sympathies of the King (who entered the Catholic Church on his deathbed). In August 1670, Talbot held his first Diocesan Synod in Dublin. It was opened with High Mass, which for forty years many of the faithful had not witnessed. In the same year, an assembly of the archbishops and bishops and representatives of the clergy was held in Dublin. At this assembly, the question of precedence and of the primatial authority gave rise to considerable discussion and led to an embittered controversy between the Archbishop of Dublin and Oliver Plunkett, Archbishop of Armagh. The subject had been one of great controversy in the Middle Ages, but had been in abeyance for some time. Both prelates considered that they were asserting the rights of their respective sees, and each published a treatise on the subject. Another meeting of the Catholic gentry was convened by Talbot, at which it was resolved to send to the Court at London a representative who would seek redress for some of the grievances to which the Catholics of Ireland were subjected. This alarmed the Protestants in Ireland, who feared that the balance of power might shift to the Catholic majority. They protested to King Charles, and in 1673 some of the repressive measures against Irish Catholics were reinstated, and Talbot was compelled to seek safety in exile.

== Exile, arrest and death ==
During his banishment, he resided generally in Paris. In 1675, Talbot, in poor health, obtained permission to return to England, and for two years he resided with a family friend at Poole Hall in Cheshire. Towards the end of 1677, he petitioned the Crown for leave "to come to Ireland to die in his own country", and through the influence of James, Duke of York his request was granted.

Shortly after that, the Popish Plot was hatched by Titus Oates, and information was forwarded to the Duke of Ormond, as Lord Lieutenant of Ireland, to the effect that a rebellion was being planned in Ireland, that Peter Talbot was one of the accomplices, and that assassins had been hired to murder the Duke himself. Ormond was in private deeply sceptical of the Popish Plot's existence, remarking that Talbot was too ill to carry it out. Of the alleged assassins, Ormond stated that they were such "silly drunken vagabonds" that "no schoolboy would trust them to rob an orchard"; but he thought it politically unwise to show his doubts publicly. Though he was sympathetic to Oliver Plunkett, who was also arrested in connection with the alleged Plot and was later to die on the gallows, he had always been hostile to Talbot.

On 8 October 1678, Ormond signed a warrant for Talbot's arrest. He was arrested at Cartown near Maynooth at the house of his brother, Colonel Richard Talbot, and was then moved to Dublin Castle.

For two years Talbot remained in prison without trial, where he fell ill. Despite their long friendship, Charles II, fearful of the political repercussions, made no effort to save him. Talbot was held in an adjoining cell to Oliver Plunkett. The two archbishops reconciled as fellow prisoners, setting aside their disagreements as expressed in their treatises.

From his prison cell, Talbot had written on 12 April 1679, petitioning that a priest be allowed to visit him, as he was bedridden for months and was now in imminent danger of death. The petition was refused, but Plunkett, on hearing of Talbot's dying condition, forced his way through the warders and administered to the dying prelate the last consolations of the sacraments. Talbot died in prison on 15 November 1680.

== Legacy ==
Talbot is said to have been interred in the churchyard of St. Audoen's Church, close by the tomb of Rowland FitzEustace, 1st Baron Portlester.

Catholic Church titles
Preceded by Richard Butler (vicar apostolic)	Archbishop of Dublin; 1669–1680	Succeeded by Patrick Russell
