= Richard Talbot, 1st Earl of Tyrconnell =

Viceroy of Ireland for James II of England

The Right Honourable The Earl of Tyrconnell PC
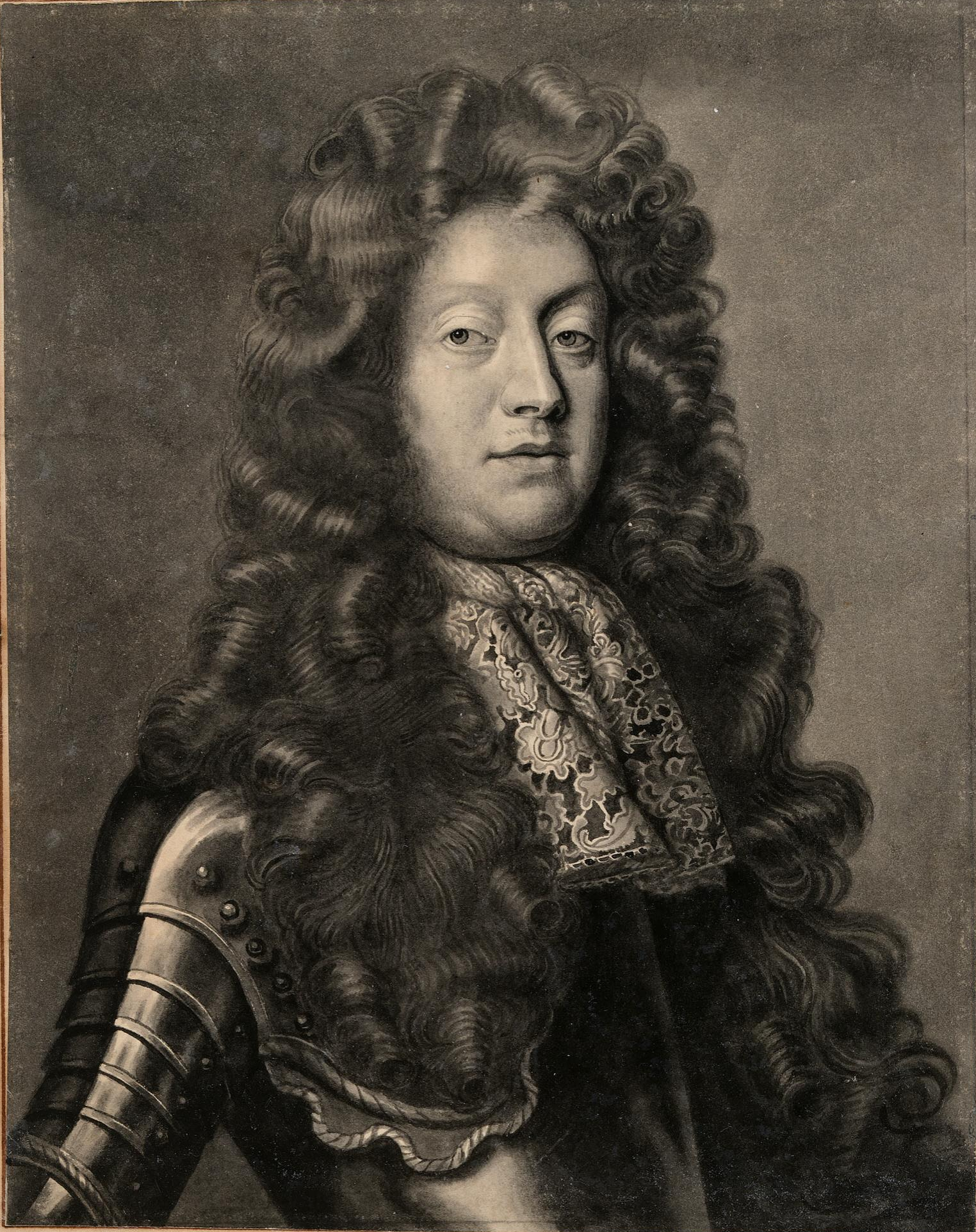
- Watercolour after portrait by Godfrey Kneller

Lord Deputy of Ireland
- In office 1687–1689
- Preceded by: The Earl of Clarendon
- Succeeded by: Lords Justices

Personal details
- Born: c. 1630 possibly Dublin
- Died: 14 August 1691 (aged 60–61) Limerick
- Spouses: Katherine Baynton (m. 1669; died 1679); Frances Jennings (m. 1681)
- Relations: Peter Talbot (brother); Eleanor Talbot, mother of Sir Neil O'Neill (sister); Mark Talbot (illegitimate son)
- Military career
- Allegiance: Confederate Ireland; Spain; Royalists in exile; Kingdom of Ireland; Jacobites
- Branch: Cavalry
- Service years: c. 1645–1660; 1685–1691
- Rank: Lieutenant general (Jacobite)
- Conflicts: Irish Confederate Wars; Dungan's Hill; Drogheda; Anglo-Spanish War (1654–1660); Dunkirk; Battle of the Dunes; Williamite War in Ireland; Battle of the Boyne

Richard Talbot, 1st Earl of Tyrconnell, PC (c. 1630 – 14 August 1691) was an Irish politician, courtier and soldier.

Talbot's early career was spent as a cavalryman in the Irish Confederate Wars. Following a period on the Continent, he joined the court of James, Duke of York, then in exile following the English Civil War; Talbot became a close and trusted associate. After the 1660 restoration of James's older brother Charles to the thrones of England, Ireland and Scotland Talbot began acting as agent or representative for Irish Catholics attempting to recover estates confiscated after the Cromwellian conquest, a role that would define the remainder of his career. James converted to Catholicism in the late 1660s, strengthening his association with Talbot.

When James took the throne in 1685, Talbot's influence increased. He oversaw a major purge of Protestants from the Irish Army, which had previously barred most Catholics. James created him Earl of Tyrconnell and later made him Viceroy, or Lord Deputy of Ireland: he immediately began building a Catholic establishment by admitting Catholics to many administrative, political and judicial posts.

Tyrconnell's efforts were interrupted by James's 1688 deposition by his Protestant son-in-law William of Orange. Tyrconnell continued as a Jacobite supporter of James during the subsequent Williamite War in Ireland, but also considered a peace settlement with William that would preserve Catholic rights. Increasingly incapacitated by illness, he died of a stroke shortly before the Jacobite defeat in 1691.

Talbot was controversial in his own lifetime; his own Chief Secretary, Thomas Sheridan, later described him as a "cunning dissembling courtier [...] turning with every wind to bring about his ambitious ends and purposes". Many 19th and early 20th century historians repeated this view. Recent assessments have suggested a more complex individual whose career was defined by personal loyalty to his patron James and above all by an effort to improve the status of the Irish Catholic gentry, particularly the "Old English" community to which he belonged.

== Birth and origins ==
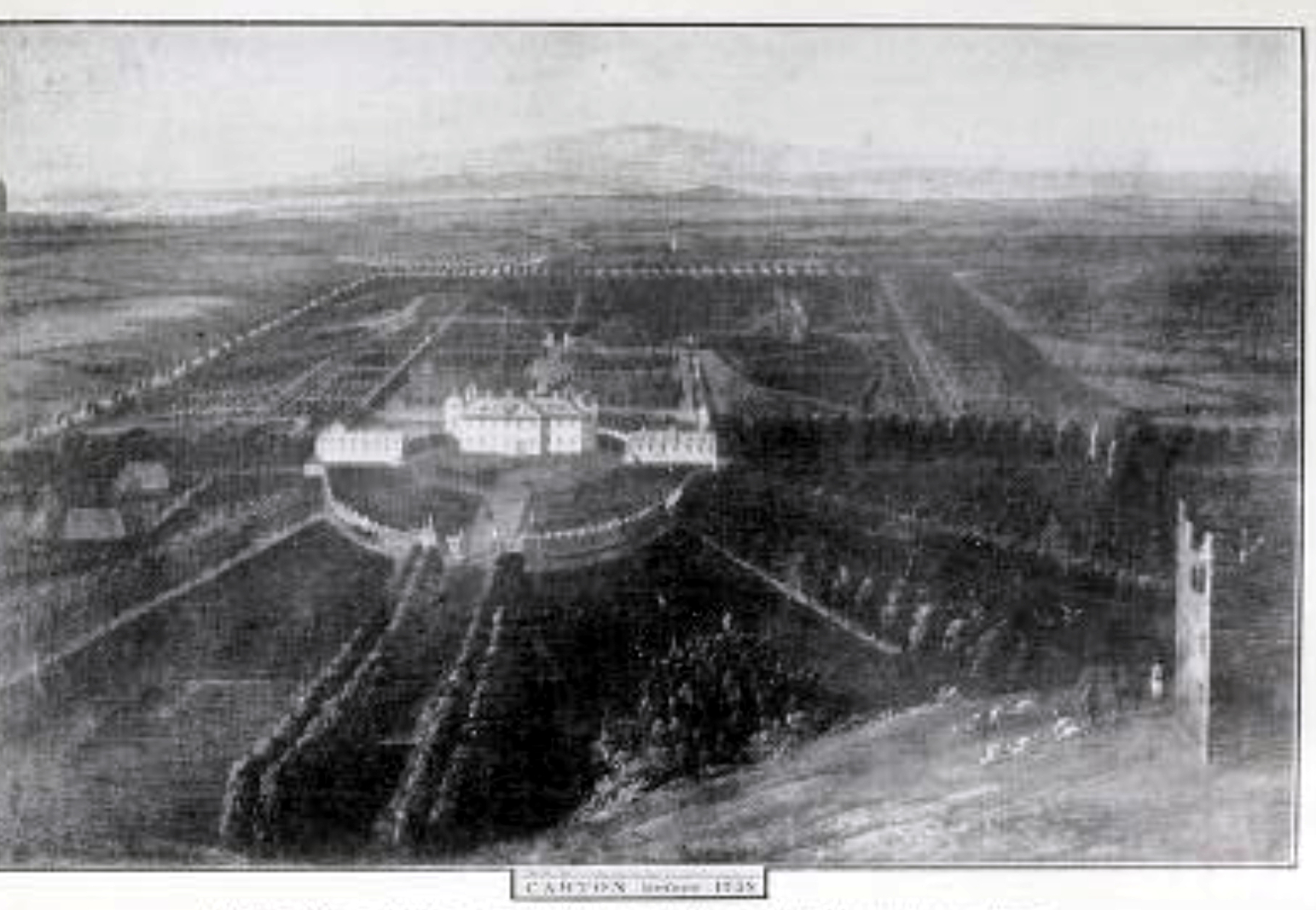
Early 18th-century view of the now demolished Talbot house at Carton Demesne; Talbot grew up here, later renaming it "Talbotstown" at the peak of his power.

Richard Talbot was born in about 1630, probably in Dublin. He was one of sixteen children, the youngest of eight sons of William Talbot and his wife Alison Netterville; William was a lawyer and the 1st Baronet Talbot of Carton. His mother was a daughter of John Netterville of Castletown, Kildare.

The Talbots were descended from a Norman family that had settled in Leinster in the 12th century; from the late 16th century, the term "Old English" was often applied to those of Anglo-Norman or Cambro-Norman descent in Ireland. Like most "Old English" families, the Talbots had adhered to the Catholic faith, despite the founding of the Reformed Church of Ireland under Henry VIII.

Other sons included Robert (c.1610–1670), who succeeded his father as the 2nd baronet, and Peter (1620–1680), a Jesuit who became the Catholic archbishop of Dublin. At least three of the eight brothers were entered into religious service on the Continent.

Little is recorded of Talbot's upbringing. As an adult he grew to be unusually tall and strong by standards of the time: the Mémoires of the Count de Gramont described him as "one of the tallest men in England and possessed of a fine and brilliant exterior". Contemporaries considered him strikingly good-looking; Sheridan, otherwise a critic, remembered him as a "tall, proper, handsome man". He was, however, notoriously quick-tempered, with a habit of throwing his wig onto the ground or into the fire when angry; his reputation for duelling earned him the nickname "Fighting Dick Talbot".

== Irish wars ==
Talbot began his military career in the Confederate War that followed the Irish Rebellion of 1641. He served in the Confederate Leinster army as a cavalry cornet under Thomas Preston; when Preston was defeated at Dungan's Hill in 1647 by Parliamentarian forces, the victors slaughtered several thousand of the Irish troops and Talbot was extremely fortunate to be ransomed back to his own side.

In September 1649 he was part of Aston's Royalist and Confederate garrison besieged in Drogheda by the Parliamentarians; he survived the wholesale massacre of the defenders by being so badly wounded he was assumed to be dead. He later escaped the town disguised as a woman, possibly with the help of a Parliamentarian officer. Talbot fled Ireland and vanished from records, re-emerging in Madrid in 1653, where he served as a captain in the Spanish army alongside other Royalist and Confederate exiles.

== Introduction to the Stuart court ==
In 1655 a Royalist agent, Daniel O'Neill, took Talbot to meet Charles II. Talbot volunteered to be part of a plot to assassinate Oliver Cromwell, but was arrested in England in July after details were leaked to the government. Initially released, he was re-arrested in November after the seizure of another assassin, Colonel James Halsall.

Talbot was questioned at Whitehall by spymaster John Thurloe, with Cromwell himself present for part of the time. Cromwell allegedly claimed a family link with Talbot and asked why he wanted to kill a man who had "never prejudiced him in his life"; Talbot's brother Peter, recalling the story, said that "nothing made me laugh more". Talbot was threatened with torture and moved to the Tower of London; that night he spent the last of his money plying Cromwell's servants with wine before climbing down a rope to a waiting boat and escaping to Antwerp. It was later suspected that Talbot might have been permitted to escape in exchange for information; nothing was proved but the affair raised suspicions in "Old Royalist" circles.

In 1656 his brother Peter introduced him to James, Duke of York. The two men struck up a close and lifelong friendship: James appointed Talbot a Gentleman of the Bedchamber. He later put Talbot in command of his own regiment, against the advice of leading Irish Royalist the Duke of Ormond, who was doubtful of Talbot's reliability and his Catholicism. Despite Ormond's misgivings, Talbot served with James's regiment in Flanders in 1657 and was present at the 1658 Siege of Dunkirk.

== The Restoration ==
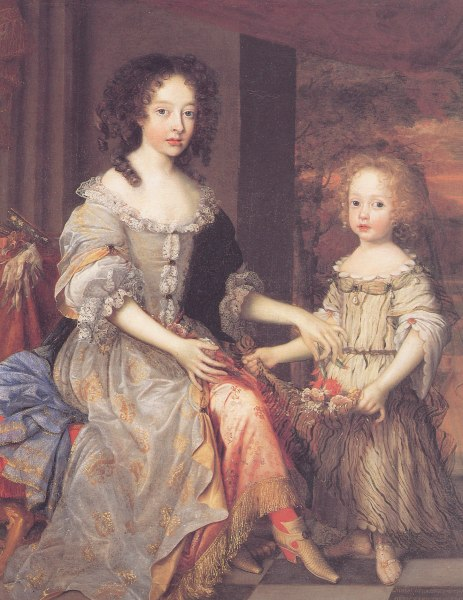
Katherine and Charlotte, Talbot's daughters

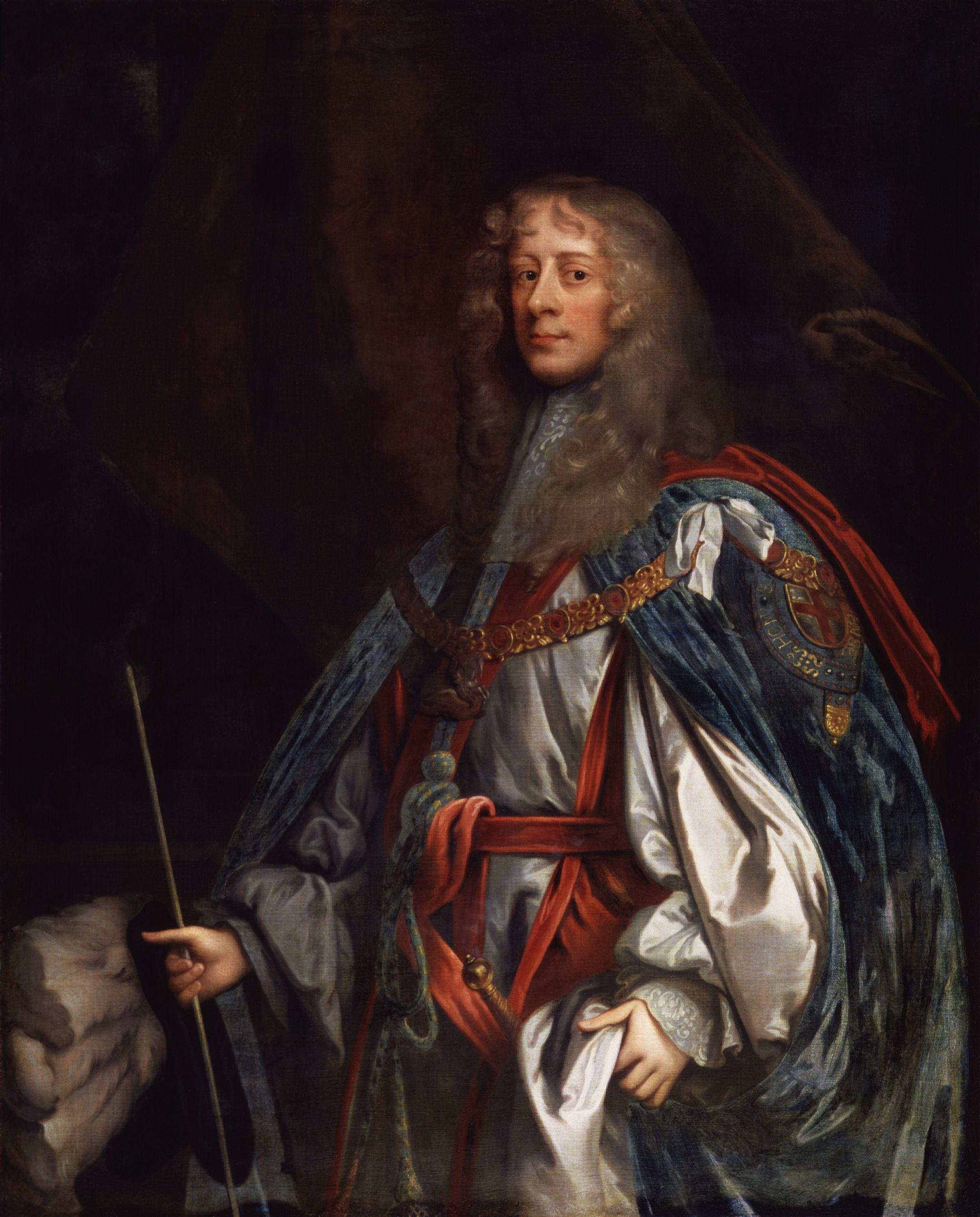
The Duke of Ormond did not trust Talbot

Talbot's influence increased after the 1660 Restoration of Charles as king. He travelled to England, where he was confirmed in the post of Gentleman of the Bedchamber and undertook a variety of diplomatic missions for the Stuart court.

The Act of Settlement 1662 rewarded those who had fought for the Royalists by making a partial reversal of the Cromwellian land settlement in Ireland. Talbot began acting as a land agent for clients hoping to acquire estates from ejected Cromwellian grantees; some were Irish Catholic landowners seeking restoration of previously forfeited estates, but his clients also included James and other court figures. After 1663 he lobbied for Catholic landowners hoping to get their cases included in a further Act. In the process he again clashed with Ormond, now Viceroy in Ireland; their argument ended with Charles sending Talbot to the Tower for a month.

Over the next decade, Talbot used his influence with James to cement his position at court: he began building links with others, like the Earl of Orrery, who were hoping to supplant the "Old Royalists" such as Ormond. He remained a divisive figure at court thanks to his imposing presence, domineering manner, and "strong opinions expressed with much swearing". In 1669 he married noted beauty Katherine Baynton, daughter of Colonel Matthew Baynton and Isabel Stapleton. They had two daughters, Katherine and Charlotte; Baynton died in 1679.

In February 1669 Ormond was dismissed and Charles began to relax restrictions on Catholics; around the same time, James himself secretly converted. In 1670 Talbot, presenting himself as the "agent general" for Irish Catholics, asked for the land question to be reopened: his initiative appeared to be making progress but collapsed in 1673 after Parliament moved to counter Catholic influence at court. The resulting 1673 Test Act led to James's conversion becoming public and with James no longer in a position to back him, Talbot was effectively barred from court for the next ten years. He spent much of the time in Yorkshire with his wife's family, later settling on his estate at Luttrellstown, County Dublin, where in 1678 he was planning to lay out a garden.

== Popish Plot and second marriage ==
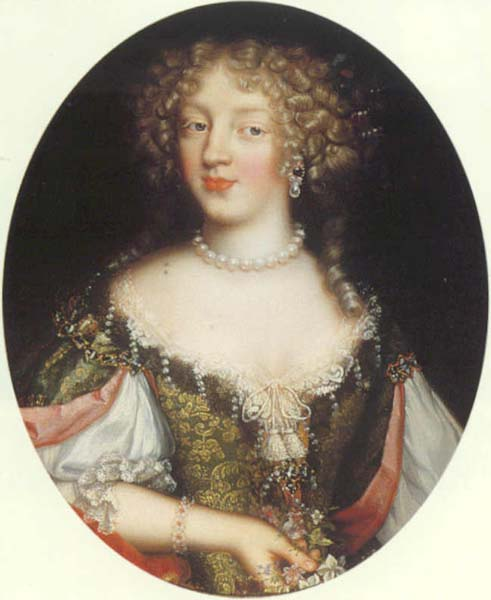
Frances Jennings, Talbot's second wife

In August 1679 he fled from Ireland to France to avoid being taken into custody for involvement in the alleged Popish Plot. His brother Peter was not so lucky: named as a key conspirator, he was arrested early in the Plot hysteria and died in prison in November 1680.

In Paris Talbot met his old love Frances Jennings, sister of Sarah Jennings (the future Sarah Churchill, Duchess of Marlborough) and married her in 1681. He returned to London following the discovery in 1683 of the Rye House Plot, an alleged plan by dissident Protestants and former Cromwellians to assassinate Charles and James. Charles issued a Royal Warrant confirming Talbot could live in Ireland, keep horses and arms, and travel freely; his prospects improved rapidly with James back in the ascendant at court and confirmed as heir to the throne.

== Apotheosis: Lord Deputy of Ireland ==
Despite his Catholicism, James succeeded to the thrones of England, Scotland and Ireland on his brother's death in 1685 with overwhelming support. Many among the political class feared a return to the violence of the Civil War and there was widespread rejoicing at the orderly succession; Protestant-backed rebellions by Charles's illegitimate son Monmouth and the Earl of Argyll were quickly put down.

James rewarded Talbot's loyalty by creating him Baron of Talbotstown, Viscount Baltinglass and Earl of Tyrconnell (3rd creation), sending him to Ireland as commander in chief of the Irish Army. James had already ordered the disbandment of Protestant militias following the Monmouth and Argyll rebellions; with James's approval Tyrconnell now began to accelerate the recruitment of Catholics into the army and by summer 1686, two-thirds of the rank and file and 40% of officers were Catholic. Reports received by the Viceroy, the Earl of Clarendon, of tensions between Catholic army units and Protestants began to cause concern both in Ireland and England. Clarendon's secretary noted "the Irish talk of nothing now but recovering their lands and bringing the English under their subjection".

Despite some resistance from James, Tyrconnell resumed efforts to improve Irish Catholics' legal status. In 1686 he got Catholics admitted to the Privy Council and one Catholic judge appointed to each of the three common law courts. When he reopened the question of whether Catholic estates should be returned, James held back, partly as English Catholics had written to him expressing concern at the effect Tyrconnell's actions might have on Protestant opinion. Clarendon found Tyrconnell's presence in Ireland deeply problematic, writing to his brother "whether my lord Tyrconnell will continue to be so terrible as he is at present nothing but time will determine".

James appointed Tyrconnell Lord Deputy of Ireland in 1687, replacing Clarendon. James had no wish to alienate Irish Protestants and made it clear Tyrconnell was not to dismiss anyone on grounds of religion; he also vetoed a statutory solution to the land question although indicated he might call an Irish parliament to discuss it in the future. He placed restrictions on Tyrconnell's power by making him Lord Deputy, rather than Lord Lieutenant, and forced an unwilling Tyrconnell to accept Thomas Sheridan as his Chief Secretary. Nevertheless, Tyrconnell pressed ahead with the appointment of Catholics to most Irish government departments, leaving only the Treasury in Protestant control; by issuing new borough charters he was able to rapidly Catholicise the local administration in preparation for a future sitting of Parliament.

== The Glorious Revolution ==
Now in his 50s, James had no male children and his daughters were Protestant. Tyrconnell's main concern had been to build a Catholic establishment secure enough to survive James's death, but his reforms had been carried out at a speed that destabilised all of James's realms. In early 1688 he sent two judges to London with draft land settlement bills; Tyrconnell hoped the second bill in particular, which proposed splitting estates and allowing Cromwellian grantees to receive the benefit of improvements, would satisfy Protestants. He wrote to James that it would resolve the issue with "as little disturbance as possible to the protestant interest and [...] restore the catholics to no more than what seems absolutely necessary". His plans, however, were to be put on hold after two events turned dissent against James into a crisis.

The birth of James Francis Edward on 10 June created a Catholic heir, excluding James's Protestant daughter Mary and her husband William of Orange. Prosecuting the Seven Bishops seemed to go beyond tolerance for Catholicism and into an assault on the Anglican establishment; their acquittal on 30 June destroyed James's political authority.

Tyrconnell saw the crisis coming: in August he warned an incredulous James that a coup was being planned in Holland. In September James ordered him to send 2,500 of the Irish army to England, including one battalion of his best troops, the Foot Guards. Tyrconnell reluctantly complied, understanding that Ireland's security was ultimately dependent on that of James's other two kingdoms.

Between William's landing in Devon in November in the Glorious Revolution and James's flight from England on 24 December, Tyrconnell was faced with a series of challenges in Ireland. Despite his regular appeals to law and order many Protestants fled to Ulster or England; Tyrconnell attempted to secure the towns with loyal Catholic army units but initially failed in the north at Enniskillen and Derry, which were held by Protestant militias. Apparently shaken by the speed of James's fall, he briefly considered opening negotiations with William. He made it known he would consider disbanding the army and resigning if Catholics could be guaranteed their position as it stood at the end of Charles's reign; William seems to have been minded to accept the offer, but Tyrconnell subsequently decided against negotiation.

== The Williamite War in Ireland ==
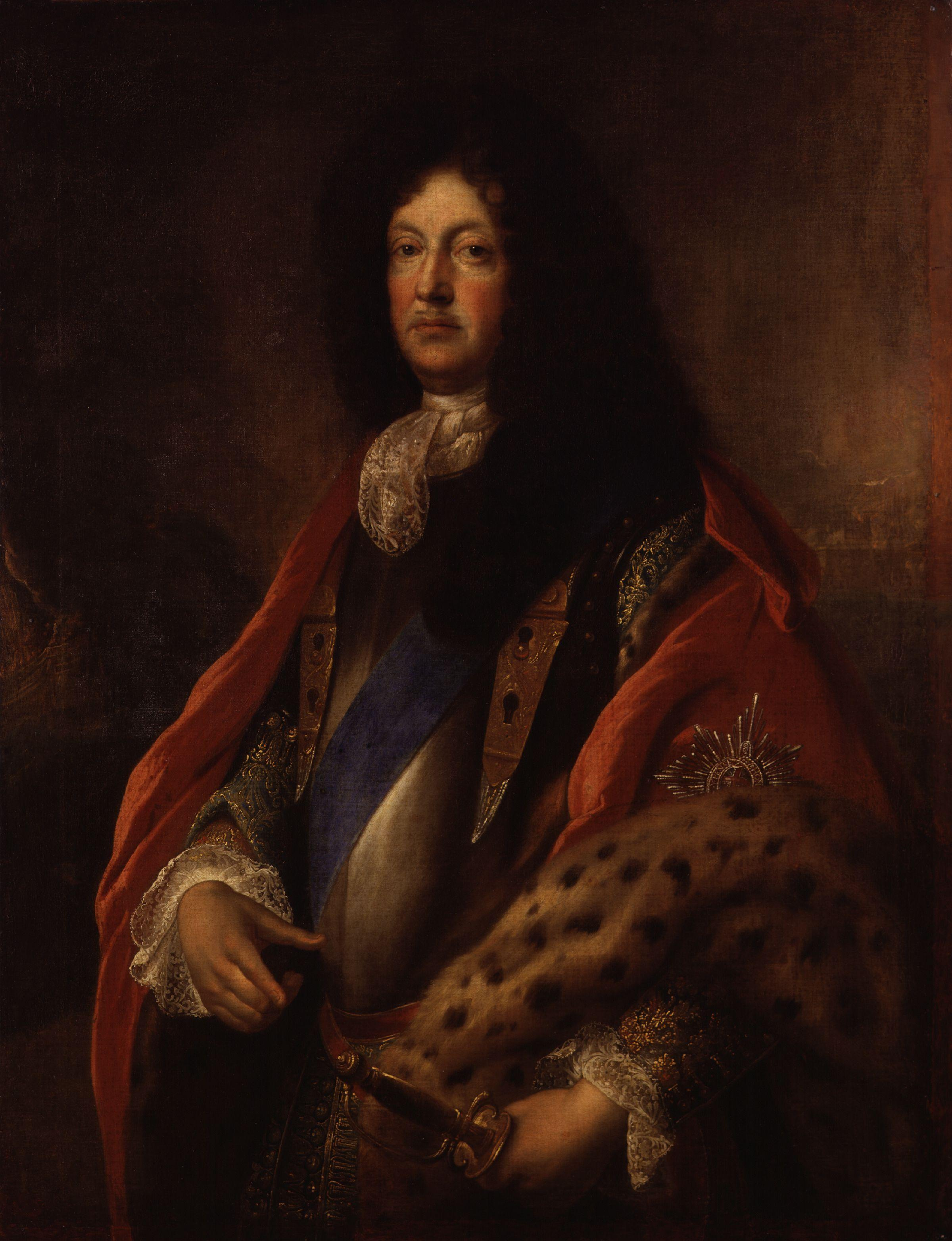
Talbot in later life, attributed to François de Troy; by the late 1680s he was increasingly ill, possibly with bouts of osteomyelitis.

In January Tyrconnell issued warrants for an enormous expansion of the Irish army by 40,000 men, giving commissions to the Catholic gentry to raise new regiments. By spring 1689, the army theoretically stood at around 36,000 although there was little money to pay them and experienced officers remained in short supply. Accompanied by French army officers, James landed at Kinsale on 12 March, intending to use Ireland as a base from which to retake England and Scotland. He met Tyrconnell at Cork several days later, creating him Duke of Tyrconnell and Marquess of Tyrconnell in the Jacobite peerage (titles recognised only by the Jacobites).

Tyrconnell was preoccupied with preparations for the sitting of Parliament, scheduled for May and vital both to raise taxes to fund the war and to make a new Act of Settlement. His work as Viceroy on reforming local corporations meant that the so-called "Patriot Parliament" was overwhelmingly Catholic. However, at this critical moment, Tyrconnell fell seriously ill, meaning he was unable to attend the Parliament he had spent so long working towards; he did not return to public life until August. Tyrconnell's absence meant that Parliament rejected his original fairly moderate bill for repealing the Act of Settlement, intended to placate Protestant opinion. To James's dismay, they would not grant him taxes unless he agreed to the far more radical proposal of undoing the Cromwellian settlement entirely.

By the time Tyrconnell had recovered, the military situation in the north had worsened. On 28 July, Percy Kirke's forces relieved Derry and the Jacobites were forced to withdraw. A large expeditionary force under Schomberg landed in Belfast Lough and captured Carrickfergus. Schomberg marched south to Dundalk and threatened to advance on Dublin; after a lengthy stalemate, the two armies withdrew into winter quarters. Both Tyrconnell and James rejected advice from their French allies to burn Dublin and retreat behind the River Shannon: Tyrconnell argued that James should take the fight to England with French support.

William himself, accompanied by thousands of new troops, landed at Carrickfergus on 14 June 1690. Tyrconnell, primarily concerned with preserving the Jacobite army, now argued against defending Dublin: "if I see any reasonable probability of beating the prince of Orange I am not for declining the battle, but if I doe not, I confess I am not for venturing the loss of all to preserve a place which you must lose as soon as the battle is lost". Nevertheless, his cavalry were one of the few Jacobite elements fully engaged in the defeat at the Boyne, mounting fierce resistance: after the battle, he urged James to leave for France.

Tyrconnell emerged as the leader of the Jacobite "Peace Party", which argued in favour of reaching a settlement with William that would preserve Catholic rights. He was opposed by Patrick Sarsfield's "War Party", influential among junior army officers, that advocated fighting on. When in August William was forced to raise the siege of the Jacobite stronghold of Limerick, Tyrconnell seemed to be proved wrong; he sailed from Galway in October, hoping to exert influence on James and the French and gain a better peace settlement by prolonging the war. He set out to return to Ireland in December but again fell sick in Brittany. After neutralising from his sickbed an attempt by the "War Party" to discredit him at James's court in exile, he arrived at Galway in January 1691, where many of the increasingly war-weary Irish were glad of his return.

It was noted that Tyrconnell, accompanied by a group of Irish lawyers rather than soldiers or weapons, appeared "better prepared to make peace than war". He immediately attempted to reassert his authority as Lord Deputy, particularly over the army. During February a French officer arrived with a letter announcing that a French general, Charles Chalmot de Saint-Ruhe, was on his way to take over command from Tyrconnell: a heartened Sarsfield had copies distributed, while Tyrconnell spread a story that the letter was a forgery and that Saint-Ruhe was his subordinate.

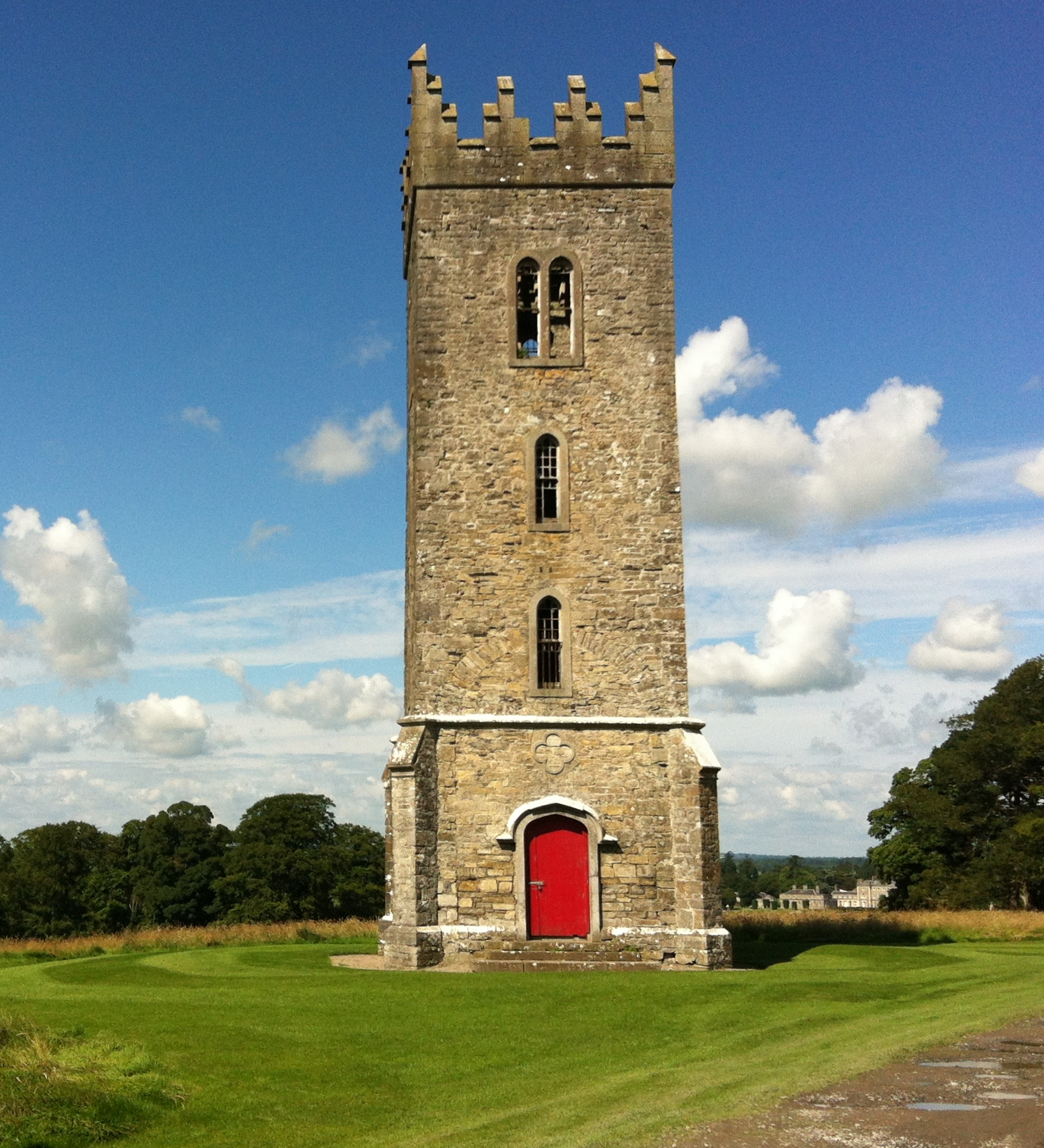
Tyrconnell Tower

Following Saint-Ruhe's arrival Tyrconnell based himself at Limerick, sending Sarsfield to the strategic town of Athlone. In June he joined the army at Athlone, but he was treated with "undisguised contempt" and his views on the town's defence ignored. Rather than risk splitting the army he returned to Limerick, thereby avoiding responsibility for the loss of Athlone on 30 June or the catastrophic Jacobite defeat at Aughrim on 12 July, where Saint-Ruhe and thousands of others were killed.

Tyrconnell re-established his authority at Limerick by demanding Jacobite officers swear a collective oath; however, he died of apoplexy on 14 August following a "merry" dinner with Saint-Ruhe's former subordinate d'Usson. He is thought to have been buried in St Mary's Cathedral. By depriving the Jacobites of their most experienced negotiator, his death may have had a substantial impact on the terms of the Treaty of Limerick that ended the war.

His widow, Frances, and his daughter, Charlotte, remained in France, where Charlotte married her kinsman, Richard Talbot, son of William Talbot of Haggardstown; their son was Richard Francis Talbot. Tyrconnell's other daughter Katherine became a nun; an illegitimate son, Mark Talbot, served as an officer in France before his death at Luzzara in 1702. Talbot's estate in nearby Carton, renamed Talbotstown, was uncompleted when he died. Tyrconnell Tower on this site was originally intended by him as a family mausoleum to replace the existing vault at Old Carton graveyard, but was also left unfinished.

== Assessment ==
Talbot made many enemies in his own lifetime; leaving little in the way of correspondence, for many years historians were compelled to rely on the letters of political adversaries such as Ormond or Clarendon. This led to an overwhelmingly negative assessment of his career and to his portrayal as "a figure midway between a buffoon and a villain". The Whig historian Macaulay depicted him as a liar and bully, calling him a "cold hearted, farsighted, scheming sycophant", while even J. P. Kenyon, writing in 1958, described him as a "bogtrotter" who spoke for the "rapacious, ignorant, anarchic forces of Irish Catholicism, at the lowest stage of civilisation in western Europe".

Recent historians have more sympathetically assessed Talbot as pursuing a realistic and attainable plan to return the Irish establishment to Catholic control, while his admitted vices are seen as reflecting the court circles in which he operated. His biographer Lenihan has written that while Talbot "could have lived uneventfully and comfortably [...] he was driven (and that is not too strong a word) to use his high connections to redress a communal and national grievance".

== Notes ==
Political offices
Preceded by The Earl of Clarendon	Lord Deputy of Ireland; 1687–1689	Succeeded by Lords Justices
Peerage of Ireland
New title	— TITULAR — Duke of Tyrconnell; Jacobite peerage 1689–1691	Extinct
New title	Earl of Tyrconnell; 1685–1691	Forfeit
