= Earl of Tyrconnell =

Irish earldom

Earl of Tyrconnell is a title that has been created four times in the Peerage of Ireland.

It was first created in 1603, for Rory O'Donnell, 1st Earl of Tyrconnell, formerly king of Tyrconnell, along with the subsidiary title Baron Donegal. The 1st Earl was succeeded by his son Hugh O'Donnell, 2nd Earl of Tyrconnell, but both titles were attainted in 1614.

Following the self-exile of the Gaelic aristocracy in 1607, and the ensuing Ulster Plantation, it was created a second time in 1661 for the 2nd Viscount FitzWilliam, but became extinct on his death in 1667.

It was created a third time in 1685 for Sir Richard Talbot, along with the subsidiary titles Viscount Baltinglass and Baron Talbotstown, but all these titles were forfeit in 1691 when Lord Tyrconnell joined King James II against the Glorious Revolution. King James also created him Duke of Tyrconnell and Marquess of Tyrconnell in 1689, but these titles were recognised only by Jacobites (see Jacobite peerage). The forfeited earldom was claimed by Talbot's nephew, the Jacobite politician William Talbot, and his descendants.

The title was created a fourth and final time in 1761 for the 3rd Baron Carpenter, along with the subsidiary title Viscount Carlingford. These titles became extinct on the death of the 4th Earl in 1853. The 1st Baron Carpenter was a distinguished soldier, who was a Member of Parliament for Whitchurch in 1715–1722 and Westminster from 1722. The 2nd Baron Carpenter was Member of Parliament for Morpeth in 1717–27 and for Weobley in 1741–7

== Earls of Tyrconnell, first creation (1603) ==
- Rory O'Donnell, 1st Earl of Tyrconnell (1575–1608)
- Hugh O'Donnell, 2nd Earl of Tyrconnell (died 1642) (attainted 1614)

== Earls of Tyrconnell, second creation (1661) ==
- Oliver FitzWilliam, 1st Earl of Tyrconnell (died 1667) (extinct)

== Earls of Tyrconnell, third creation (1685) ==
- Richard Talbot, 1st Earl of Tyrconnell (died 1691) (forfeit 1691)

== Earls of Tyrconnell, fourth creation ==
=== Baron Carpenter (of Killaghy) (1719) ===
- General George Carpenter, 1st Baron Carpenter (1657–1732)
- George Carpenter, 2nd Baron Carpenter (died 1749)
- George Carpenter, 3rd Baron Carpenter (1723–1762) (created Earl of Tyrconnell in 1761)

=== Earls of Tyrconnell (1761) ===
- George Carpenter, 1st Earl of Tyrconnell (1723–1762)
- George Carpenter, 2nd Earl of Tyrconnell (1750–1805)
- George Carpenter, 3rd Earl of Tyrconnell (1788–1812)
- John Delaval Carpenter, 4th Earl of Tyrconnell (1790–1853) (earldom extinct)

The earl had no surviving children. Upon his demise, and then that of his spouse, the Carpenter surname and arms Carpenter were assumed by royal licence, dated 1 June 1868, by the Hon. Walter Cecil Carpenter (1834–1904), until then known as the Hon. Walter Cecil Talbot. He later became an Admiral in the Royal Navy.
