= De La Rochethulon =

de La Rochethulon is a surname. Notable people with the surname include:

- Claude-René Thibaut de Noblet de La Rochethulon (1749–1821), French politician
- Emmanuel-Marie-Stanislas Thibaut de La Rochethulon (1832–1890), French politician
- Georges de La Rochethulon (1868–1941), French politician
