= Salles =

Salles may refer to a French toponymic surname (including the Salles family, a noble family), as well as some communes and other places, mainly in France:

- Salles (surname), a French toponymic surname
- Salles, Gironde, in the Gironde department
- Salles, Lot-et-Garonne, in the Lot-et-Garonne department
- Salles, Hautes-Pyrénées, in the Hautes-Pyrénées department
- Salles, Deux-Sèvres, in the Deux-Sèvres department
- Salles, Tarn, in the Tarn department

== See also ==
- Salles-de-Villefagnan, in Charente department
- Salles-la-Source, in Aveyron department
