= Sainte-Blandine, Deux-Sèvres =

Sainte-Blandine
- Part of Aigondigné
- Location of Sainte-Blandine
- Location within France Location within Nouvelle-Aquitaine
- Coordinates: 46°14′32″N 0°16′22″W
- Country: France
- Region: Nouvelle-Aquitaine
- Department: Deux-Sèvres
- Arrondissement: Niort
- Canton: Celles-sur-Belle
- Commune: Aigondigné
- Area^{1}: 16.27 km^{2} (6.28 sq mi)
- Elevation: 100 m (330 ft)
- Highest elevation: 111 m (364 ft)
- Lowest elevation: 46 m (151 ft)
- Population (2021): 685
  - Density: 42.1/km^{2} (109/sq mi)
- Time zone: UTC+01:00 (CET)
  - Summer (DST): UTC+02:00 (CEST)
- Postal code: 79370
- ^{1} French Land Register data, which excludes lakes, ponds, glaciers > 1 km^{2} (0.386 sq mi or 247 acres) and river estuaries.

Sainte-Blandine (French pronunciation: [sɛ̃t blɑ̃din]) is a former commune in the Deux-Sèvres department in western France. On 1 January 2019, it was merged into the new commune of Aigondigné.

== Population ==
Historical population
Year	Pop.	±% p.a.
2006	608	—
2011	701	+2.89%
2015	720	+0.67%
2021	685	−0.83%
Source: INSEE

== See also ==
- Communes of the Deux-Sèvres department
