= Mougon-Thorigné =

- Part of Aigondigné
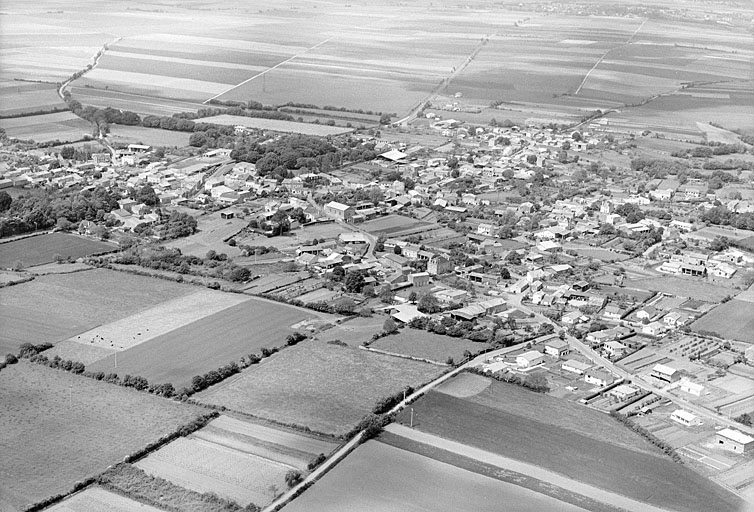
- An aerial view of Mougon
- Location of Mougon-Thorigné
- Location within France Location within Nouvelle-Aquitaine
- Coordinates: 46°17′41″N 0°17′10″W
- Country: France
- Region: Nouvelle-Aquitaine
- Department: Deux-Sèvres
- Arrondissement: Niort
- Canton: Celles-sur-Belle
- Commune: Aigondigné
- Area^{1}: 38.55 km^{2} (14.88 sq mi)
- Population (2016): 3,437
  - Density: 89.16/km^{2} (230.9/sq mi)
- Time zone: UTC+01:00 (CET)
  - Summer (DST): UTC+02:00 (CEST)
- Postal code: 79370
- ^{1} French Land Register data, which excludes lakes, ponds, glaciers > 1 km^{2} (0.386 sq mi or 247 acres) and river estuaries.

Mougon-Thorigné (French pronunciation: [muɡɔ̃ tɔʁiɲe]) was a short-lived commune in the department of Deux-Sèvres in western France. The commune was established on 1 January 2017 by merger of the former communes of Mougon and Thorigné. On 1 January 2019, it was merged into the new commune Aigondigné.

== See also ==
- Communes of the Deux-Sèvres department
