= Charles Chalmot de Saint-Ruhe =

French cavalry officer (c.1650–1691)

- Born: c. 1650; France, probably Poitou (modern Deux-Sèvres)
- Died: 12 July 1691 (aged 40–41); Attidermot, Aughrim, County Galway, Ireland
- Burial place: Loughrea
- Other name: Marquis de Saint Ruth
- Spouse: Marie de Cossé
- Military career
- Allegiance: France
- Branch: Cavalry
- Service years: c. 1670 – 1691
- Rank: Lieutenant-General
- Conflicts: Battle of Staffarda; Siege of Athlone; Battle of Aughrim †

Charles Chalmot de Saint-Ruhe (Note: Erroneously spelt "Chalmont" and "Saint Ruth" in most English language sources. His own signature uses the form "Chalmot de Saint-Ruhe": "St Ruth" seems to have been taken from the writing of Pierre Jurieu.) (c. 1650 – 12 July 1691) was a French cavalry officer, serving in the armies of Louis XIV.

Despite a long career, Saint-Ruhe is remembered largely for his brief service in Ireland during the Williamite War, in which France provided military support to the Jacobite forces of James II. While in command of James's Irish Army, he was killed at the Battle of Aughrim, a defeat that led to the collapse of the Jacobite cause.

== Origins and family ==
Saint-Ruhe or Saint-Rhue was an estate in the parish of Saint-Médard corresponding to the modern hamlet of Sainte-Rue in the commune of Celles-sur-Belle, Deux-Sèvres. The Chalmot family, of the minor nobility class, first appeared in records from Niort in the 15th century, often serving as local administrators; many were Protestants, including at least one Protestant minister. Several members left France following the 1685 revocation of the Edict of Nantes, including one, Jacques de Chalmot, who entered Dutch military service. The seigneurs of Saint-Ruhe appear to have been descended from Philippe Chalmot, seigneur de la Briaudière and alderman of Niort in the early 17th century.

Little else is known of Saint-Ruhe's background or family. He married Marie de Cossé, widow of Charles de La Porte, Duc de La Meilleraye. Marie, born in 1622, was many years older and the marriage was childless; she lived until 1710. Although he is not known to have had any legitimate direct descendants, the Rev. Alexander Franklin of St. Mark's Church, Dublin, claimed to have met a great-grandson of Saint-Ruhe serving in the Fitzjames regiment of the Irish Brigade around the time of the French Revolution.

Robert Parker, who fought against the Jacobites at Aughrim, described Saint-Ruhe as "a gallant, brave man, and a good officer". The soldier and diplomat Saint-Simon, in his Memoirs, painted a less flattering portrait. This should be treated with some caution as he was only sixteen when Saint-Ruhe died, though he did apparently meet him. He described him as a "gentleman in a small way", tall and well built but exceptionally ugly; a gallant soldier but notorious for domestic cruelty. According to Saint-Simon, Saint-Ruhe's treatment of his wife became so brutal that she eventually asked the King to intervene. Louis treated her with great sympathy and ordered her husband to stop, but when the ill-treatment continued the King began sending him on unnecessary missions to free his wife of his company.

== Career in France ==
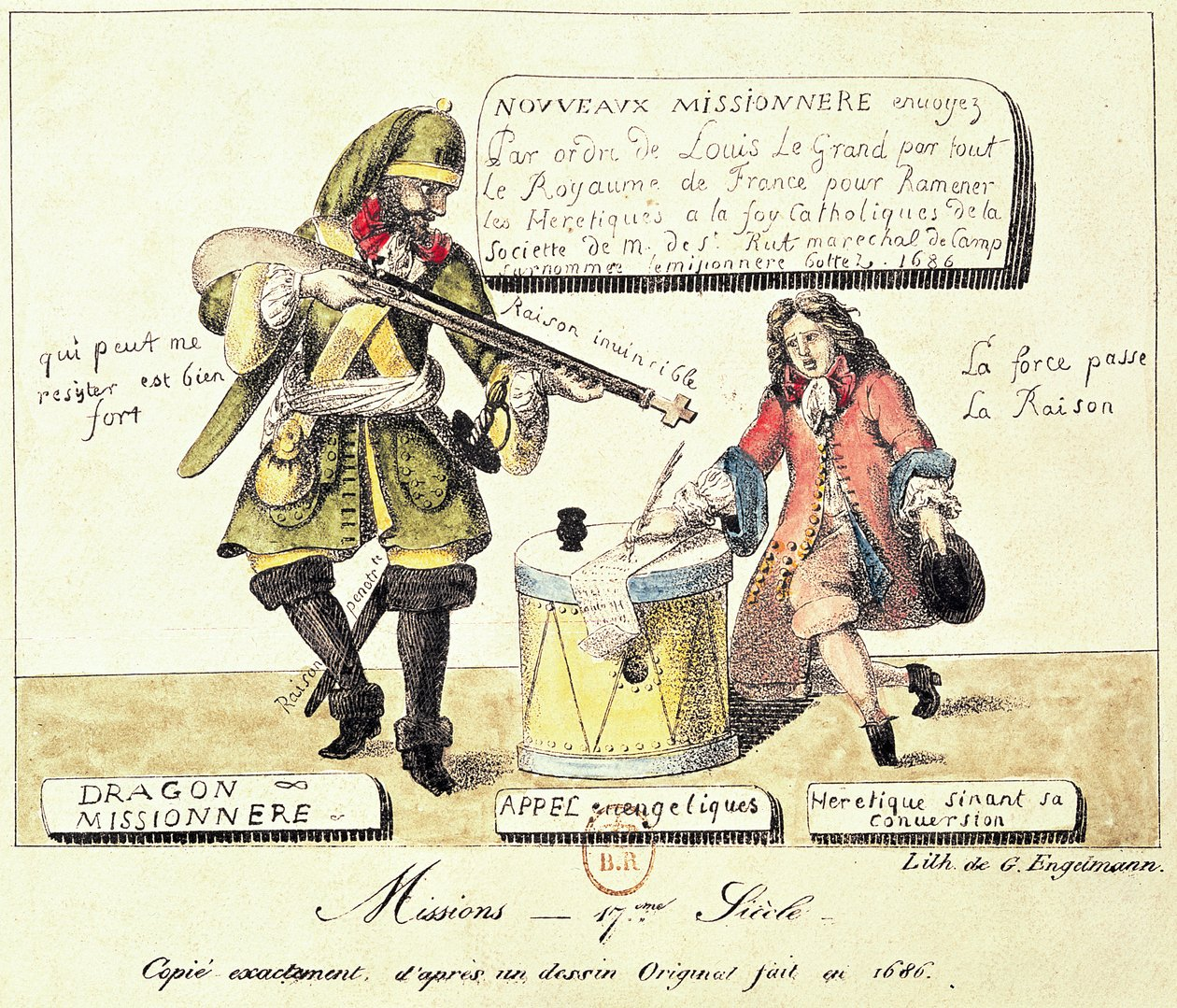
19th-century copy of a 1686 caricature depicting the French dragonnades, in which dragoons were used to intimidate Huguenot families into conversion; Saint-Ruhe was said to have been responsible for several such campaigns

Charles Chalmot served as a lieutenant in the prestigious Garde du Corps, the king's household cavalry. He was recorded as holding the rank of captain of cavalry in 1670, mestre de camp in 1672, and brigadier in 1677. In 1686, he replaced Boufflers as commander in Guyenne. A Catholic unlike many of his family, he is supposed to have taken part in Louis XIV's dragonnades, in which dragoons were quartered on Protestant households to try and force their conversion. By 1688, he had been promoted to lieutenant-general.

In 1690, Chalmot was with the army besieging the town of Annecy and played a part in the victory at the Battle of Staffarda, among other engagements. His association with the Irish conflict began while still in France, when he received the command of a brigade of Irish troops under Mountcashel, originally sent to France in 1689 in exchange for French personnel.

== Campaign in Ireland ==
In response to requests from James II and his viceroy Tyrconnell, Louis sent Saint-Ruhe to replace James's illegitimate son Berwick as commander of the Irish Army. The decision was made in January although the Irish were not informed until April. Saint-Ruhe had secret instructions to assess the situation and help Louis make a decision on whether to send further military aid. With a temporary general's commission and accompanied by lieutenant-generals de Tessé and d'Usson, Saint-Ruhe arrived at Limerick on 9 May 1691, bringing sufficient arms, corn and meal to sustain the army until the autumn.

William's forces in Ireland were by this stage led by his subordinate, Dutch officer Godert de Ginkel. Ginkel was aware of the poor military situation facing William in the Netherlands; seeking a quick end to the war he had obtained William's permission to offer the Jacobites moderate terms of surrender. However, by late spring 1691, Ginkel was concerned that a French convoy could land further reinforcements at Galway or Limerick, and began planning to enter the field as quickly as possible. During May, both sides began assembling their forces for a summer campaign, the Jacobites at Limerick and the Williamites at Mullingar.

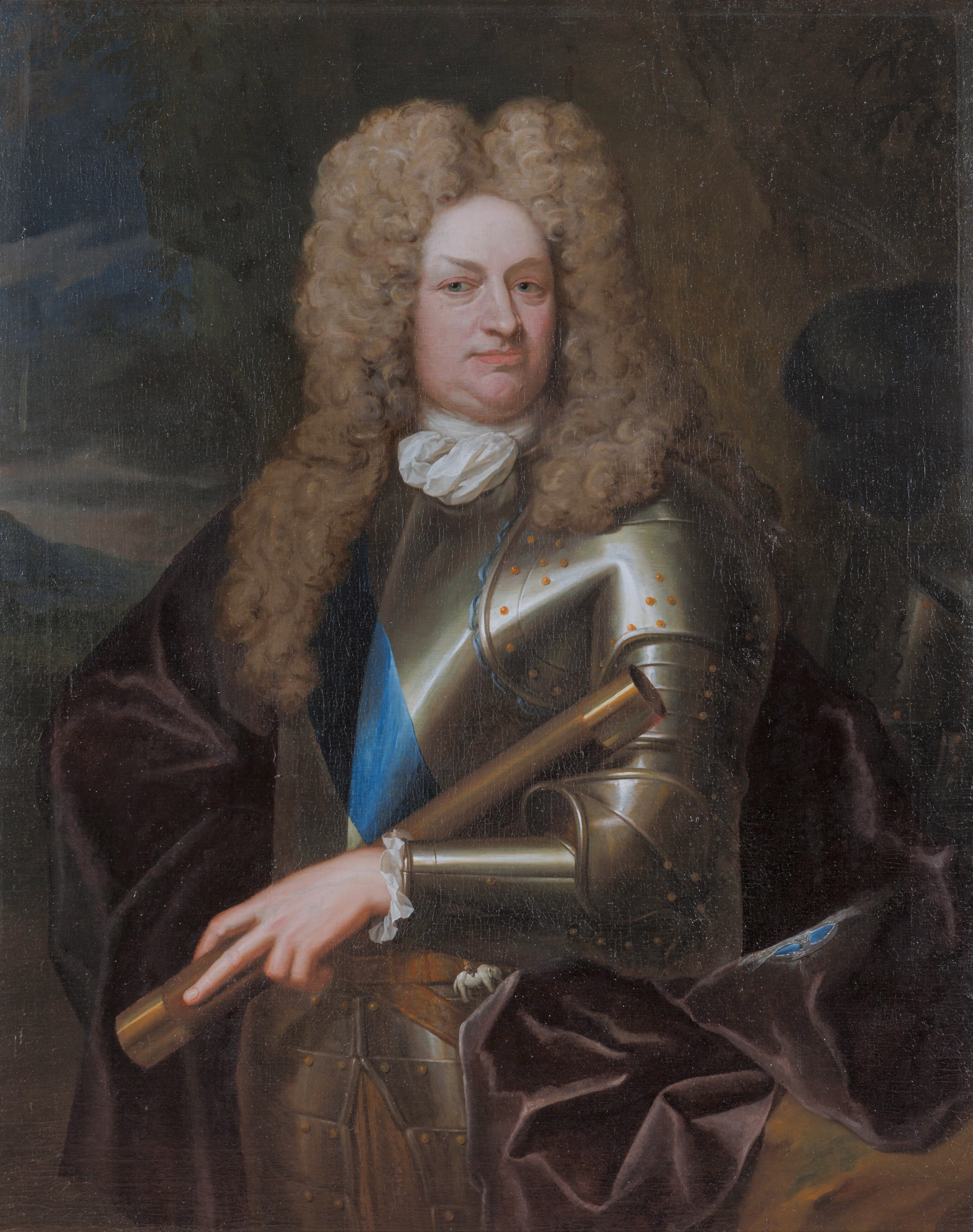
Godert de Ginkel, the Williamite commander at Aughrim

On 16 June, Ginkel's cavalry reconnoitred from Ballymore towards the Jacobite garrison at Athlone. Saint-Ruhe had been unsure where Ginkel would attempt to cross the Shannon, but by 19 June he realised Athlone was the target and began concentrating his troops west of the town. Ginkel breached the Jacobite lines of defence and took Athlone on 30 June after a bloody siege; Saint-Ruhe was unable to relieve the town and fell back to the west, his army depleted by large-scale desertions.

Athlone was seen as a significant victory and likely to provoke the collapse of the Jacobite army. The Lords Justice in Dublin issued a proclamation offering generous terms for Jacobites who surrendered, including a free pardon, restoration of forfeited estates, and the offer of similar or higher rank and pay if they wished to join William's army.

=== Aughrim ===
Unaware of the location of Saint-Ruhe's main army and assuming he was outnumbered, on 10 July Ginkel began a cautious advance through Ballinasloe down the main Limerick and Galway road.

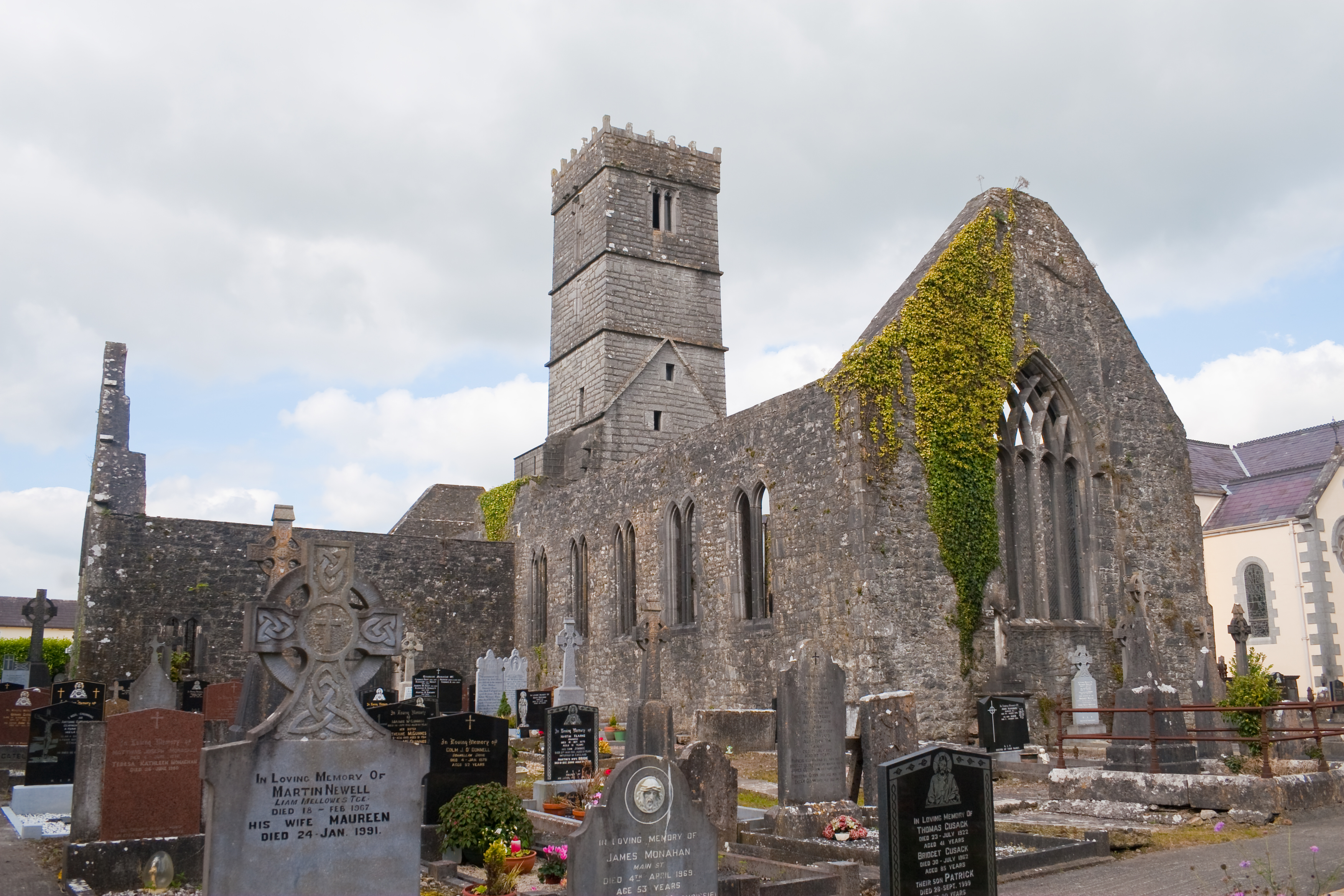
The Carmelite priory at Loughrea, where Saint-Ruhe was supposedly buried

Saint-Ruhe and Tyrconnell initially planned to fall back on Limerick and force Ginkel into another year of campaigning. Saint-Ruhe issued an order to disperse to Galway and Limerick and sent several of his subordinate commanders, including d'Usson, onward. However, as deserters began to rejoin the army at Ballinasloe, Saint-Ruhe revised his strategy. Wishing to redeem his humiliation at Athlone, he appears to have instead decided to force a decisive battle. He reinforced the morale of the rank and file by stressing that the conflict was a defense of the Catholic Church in Ireland against religious persecution and by "creating a personality cult around himself with bloodthirsty promises of what the army would do to its foes".

Ginkel found his way blocked by the Jacobite army at Aughrim on the early morning of 12 July 1691. Saint-Ruhe had chosen an extremely strong defensive position, his infantry occupying the slopes of a ridge known as Kilcommadan Hill, with its flanks protected by marshy ground. He left the Jacobite camp "standing with all their baggage [...] not excepting his own"; Parker noted this obliged the Jacobite army to fight and suggested Saint-Ruhe's "resolution to conquer or die". Both armies began a preparatory cannonade at about 2 p.m.; Ginkel ordered probing attacks on the Jacobite lines followed by a large-scale infantry assault under Mackay.

The Jacobites repulsed Ginkel's attacks for several hours, while counter-attacks caused heavy losses in the Williamite army. Saint-Ruhe is reputed to have been confident of victory and organising a further attack when, at around eight o'clock, he was decapitated by a roundshot. The loss of Saint-Ruhe was among several factors that precipitated a collapse in the Jacobite army; the battle ended in a rout, with several thousand Jacobites dead.

According to the Jacobite author Nicholas Plunkett, Saint-Ruhe's body was carried off and brought to the town of Loughrea, where it was later interred privately at night at the Carmelite Abbey cemetery. Other accounts suggested that he was buried at Kilcommadan or that his remains were thrown into a bog or left on the field.

== In folklore ==
The death of Saint-Ruhe gave rise to a great deal of folklore in Galway; a well-known story is that a local sheep farmer and one of his shepherds, angry at having their flock taken by Jacobite soldiers, gave an artillery officer called Trench information enabling them to target the Jacobite general.

At the spot where Saint-Ruhe supposedly fell a whitethorn grew, afterwards named "St Ruth's Bush"; a light was said to have been seen dancing around it at night, while visitors took away twigs from it as souvenirs. The site is still marked by a plaque near the Beara-Breifne Way. "St Ruth's Flag" was an irregular black stone in the old graveyard of Kilcommadan, reputed to have marked the place of his burial.
