= La Couarde =

Commune in Deux-Sèvres, France

- Part of Prailles-La Couarde
- Coat of arms
- Location of La Couarde
- Location within France Location within Nouvelle-Aquitaine
- Coordinates: 46°19′14″N 0°09′29″W
- Country: France
- Region: Nouvelle-Aquitaine
- Department: Deux-Sèvres
- Arrondissement: Niort
- Canton: Celles-sur-Belle
- Commune: Prailles-La Couarde
- Area^{1}: 16.36 km^{2} (6.32 sq mi)
- Elevation: 180 m (590 ft)
- Highest elevation: 189 m (620 ft)
- Lowest elevation: 119 m (390 ft)
- Population (2022): 272
  - Density: 16.6/km^{2} (43.1/sq mi)
- Time zone: UTC+01:00 (CET)
  - Summer (DST): UTC+02:00 (CEST)
- Postal code: 79800
- ^{1} French Land Register data, which excludes lakes, ponds, glaciers > 1 km^{2} (0.386 sq mi or 247 acres) and river estuaries.

La Couarde (French pronunciation: [la kwaʁd]) is a former commune in the Deux-Sèvres department in the Nouvelle-Aquitaine region in western France. On 1 January 2019, it was merged into the new commune Prailles-La Couarde.

== See also ==
- Communes of the Deux-Sèvres department
