= Pierre Moinot =

French novelist (1920–2007)

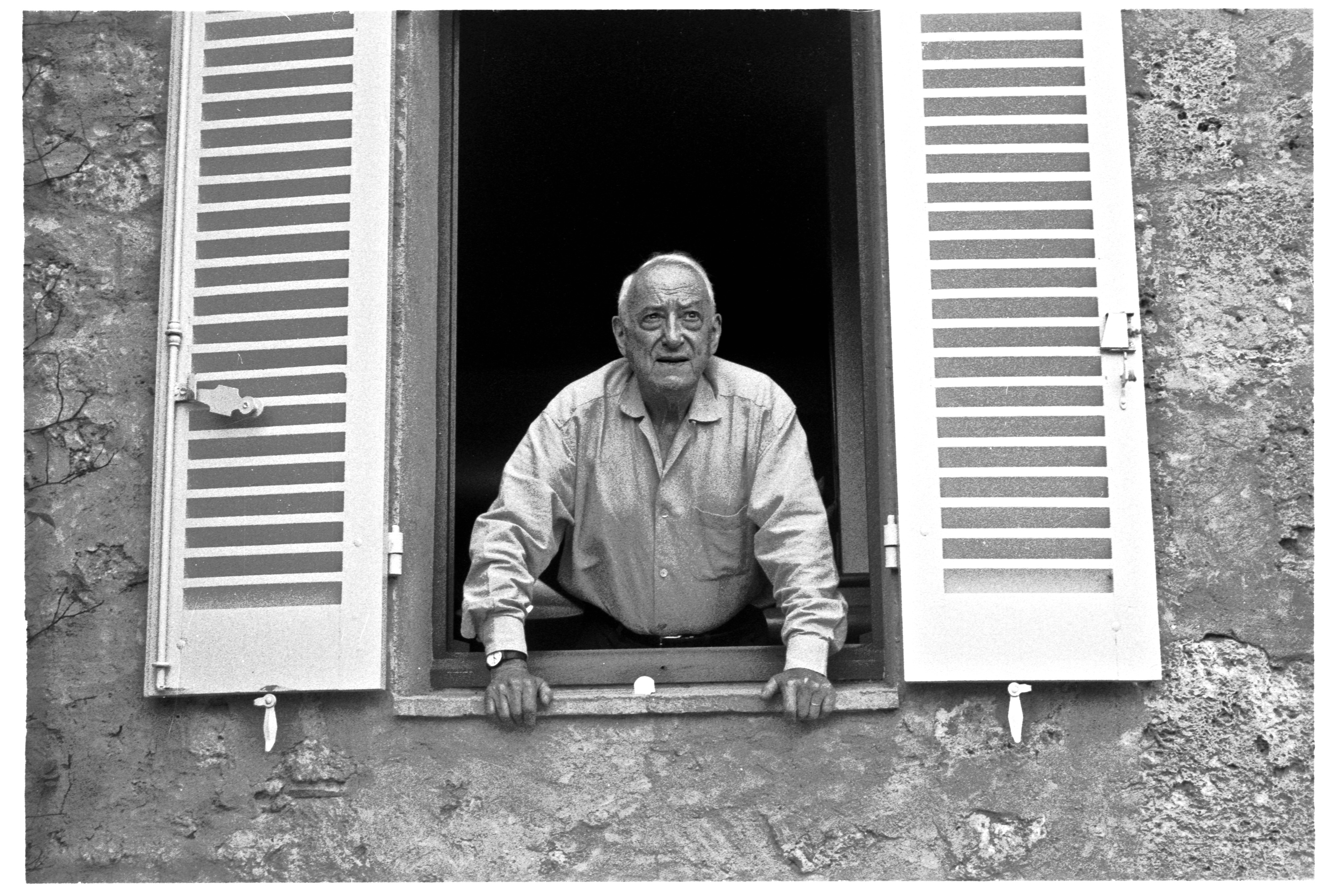
- Pierre Moinot in 1999 at his home in Salernes
- Born: 29 March 1920; Fressines, France
- Died: 6 March 2007 (aged 86); Paris, France
- Occupation: Novelist
- Known for: Member of the Académie française

Pierre Moinot (French pronunciation: [pjɛʁ mwano]; 29 March 1920, in Fressines, Deux-Sèvres – 6 March 2007, in Paris) was a French novelist. He was elected to the Académie française on 21 January 1982.

== Bibliography ==
- Armes et Bagages, roman (1952)
- La Chasse royale, roman (1954) - Grand Prix du roman de l'Académie française – The Royal Hunt, tr. Ralph Manheim (1955)
- La Blessure, nouvelles (1957)
- Le Voleur, court métrage (adaptation) (1960)
- Le Sable vif, roman (1964) – An Ancient Enemy, tr. Francis Price (1965)
- Repos à Bacoli, dramatique (1966)
- Quand la liberté venait du ciel, série de douze dramatiques (1967)
- Héliogabale, théâtre (1971)
- La Griffe et la Dent, album animalier (1977)
- Mazarin, série de quatre dramatiques originales (1978)
- Mazarin, scénario (1978)
- Le Guetteur d’ombre, roman (1979)
- Jeanne d'Arc, série de quatre dramatiques originales (1988, in collaboration with Jean-François Griblin)
- Jeanne d’Arc, le pouvoir et l’innocence (1988)
- La Descente du fleuve, roman (1991)
- Tous comptes faits, entretiens (1993)
- T. E. Lawrence en guerre, étude (1994)
- Attention à la peinture (1997)
- Tous comptes faits, entretiens (2nd edition, 1997)
- Le matin vient et aussi la nuit (1999) – As Night Follows Day, tr. Jody Gladding and Elizabeth Deshays (2001)
- La Mort en lui (2002)
- Coup d'état (2003)
- La Saint-Jean d'été (2007)
