= Vitré, Deux-Sèvres =

Vitré
- Part of Beaussais-Vitré
- Location of Vitré
- Location within France Location within Nouvelle-Aquitaine
- Coordinates: 46°17′02″N 0°11′53″W
- Country: France
- Region: Nouvelle-Aquitaine
- Department: Deux-Sèvres
- Arrondissement: Niort
- Canton: Celles-sur-Belle
- Commune: Beaussais-Vitré
- Area^{1}: 9.87 km^{2} (3.81 sq mi)
- Elevation: 136 m (446 ft)
- Highest elevation: 161 m (528 ft)
- Lowest elevation: 102 m (335 ft)
- Population (2019): 534
  - Density: 54.1/km^{2} (140/sq mi)
- Time zone: UTC+01:00 (CET)
  - Summer (DST): UTC+02:00 (CEST)
- Postal code: 79370
- ^{1} French Land Register data, which excludes lakes, ponds, glaciers > 1 km^{2} (0.386 sq mi or 247 acres) and river estuaries.

Vitré (French pronunciation: [vitʁe]) is a former commune in the Deux-Sèvres department in western France. It merged into the new commune of Beaussais-Vitré on 1 January 2013.

== See also ==
- Communes of the Deux-Sèvres department
