= Prailles =

Commune in Deux-Sèvres, France

- Part of Prailles-La Couarde
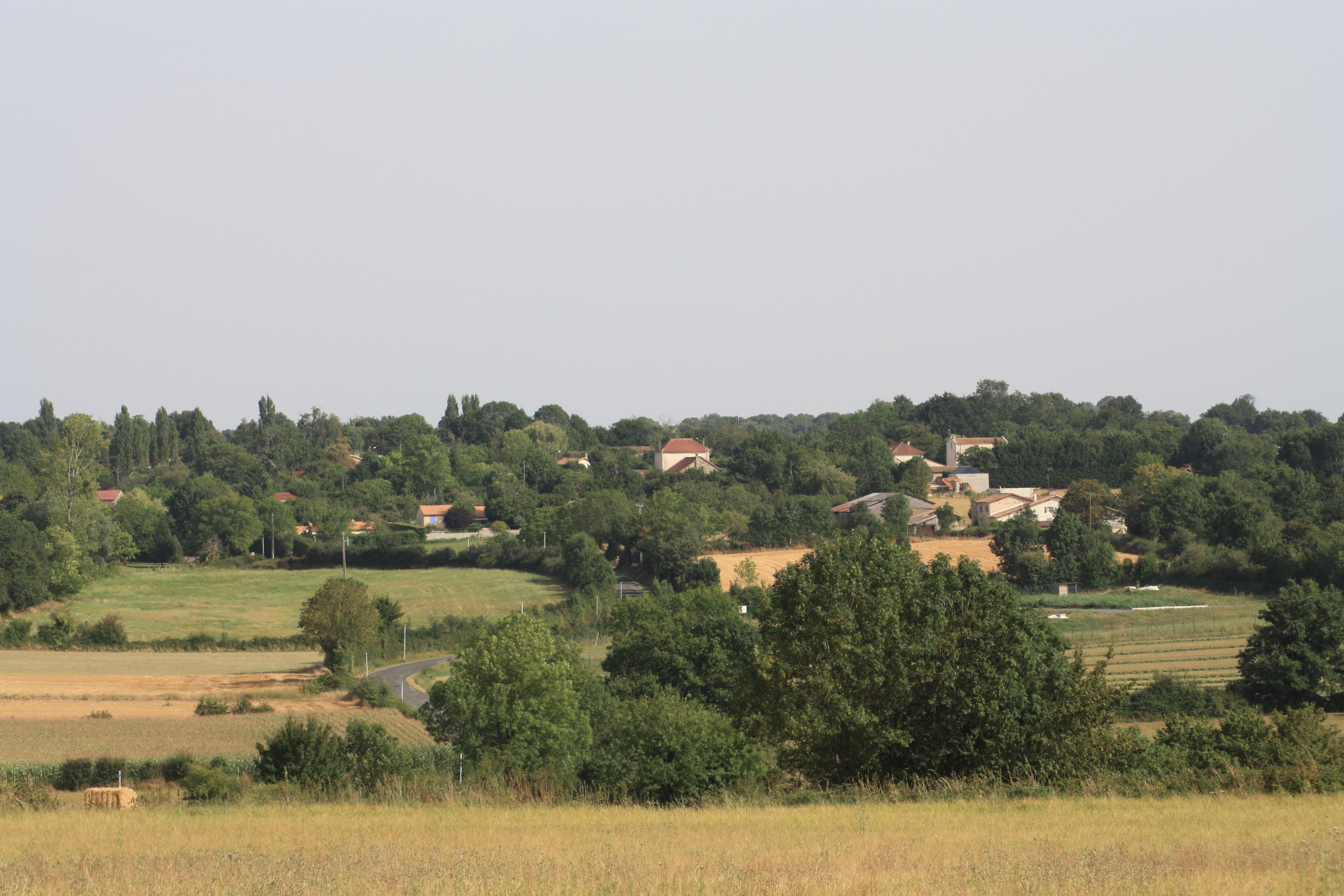
- A general view of Prailles
- Location of Prailles
- Location within France Location within Nouvelle-Aquitaine
- Coordinates: 46°19′28″N 0°13′02″W
- Country: France
- Region: Nouvelle-Aquitaine
- Department: Deux-Sèvres
- Arrondissement: Niort
- Canton: Celles-sur-Belle
- Commune: Prailles-La Couarde
- Area^{1}: 18.86 km^{2} (7.28 sq mi)
- Elevation: 100 m (330 ft)
- Highest elevation: 177 m (581 ft)
- Lowest elevation: 98 m (322 ft)
- Population (2022): 664
  - Density: 35.2/km^{2} (91.2/sq mi)
- Time zone: UTC+01:00 (CET)
  - Summer (DST): UTC+02:00 (CEST)
- Postal code: 79370
- ^{1} French Land Register data, which excludes lakes, ponds, glaciers > 1 km^{2} (0.386 sq mi or 247 acres) and river estuaries.

Prailles (French pronunciation: [pʁaj]) is a former commune in the Deux-Sèvres department in western France. On 1 January 2019, it was merged into the new commune Prailles-La Couarde.

== See also ==
- Communes of the Deux-Sèvres department
