= Mougon =

- Part of Aigondigné
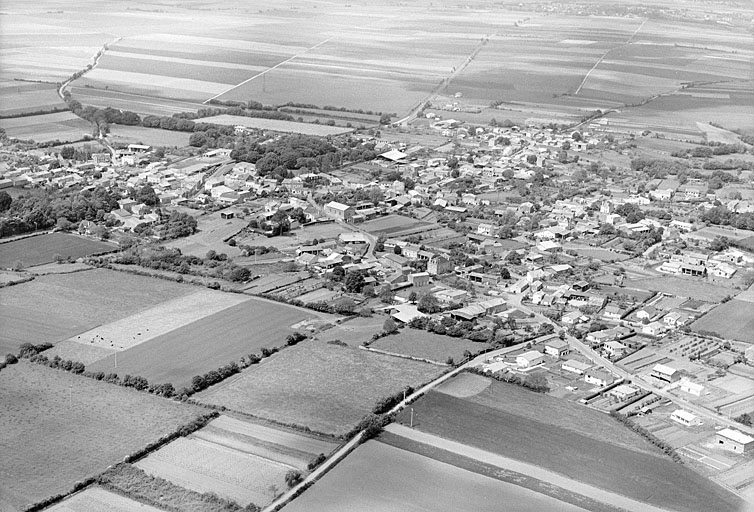
- An aerial view of Mougon

- Coat of arms
- Location of Mougon
- Location within France Location within Nouvelle-Aquitaine
- Coordinates: 46°17′41″N 0°17′10″W
- Country: France
- Region: Nouvelle-Aquitaine
- Department: Deux-Sèvres
- Arrondissement: Niort
- Canton: Celles-sur-Belle
- Commune: Aigondigné
- Area^{1}: 21.29 km^{2} (8.22 sq mi)
- Elevation: 89 m (292 ft)
- Highest elevation: 131 m (430 ft)
- Lowest elevation: 44 m (144 ft)
- Population (2022): 2,152
  - Density: 101.1/km^{2} (261.8/sq mi)
- Time zone: UTC+01:00 (CET)
  - Summer (DST): UTC+02:00 (CEST)
- Postal code: 79370
- ^{1} French Land Register data, which excludes lakes, ponds, glaciers > 1 km^{2} (0.386 sq mi or 247 acres) and river estuaries.

Mougon (French pronunciation: [muɡɔ̃]) is a former commune in the Deux-Sèvres department in western France. On 1 January 2017, it was merged into the short-lived commune Mougon-Thorigné, that was merged into the new commune Aigondigné on 1 January 2019.

== Population ==
Historical population
Year	Pop.	±% p.a.
2006	1,765	—
2011	2,059	+3.13%
2022	2,152	+0.40%
Source: INSEE

== See also ==
- Communes of the Deux-Sèvres department
