= Aigonnay =

- Part of Aigondigné
- Location of Aigonnay
- Location within France Location within Nouvelle-Aquitaine
- Coordinates: 46°19′50″N 0°15′25″W
- Country: France
- Region: Nouvelle-Aquitaine
- Department: Deux-Sèvres
- Arrondissement: Niort
- Canton: Celles-sur-Belle
- Commune: Aigondigné
- Area^{1}: 14.05 km^{2} (5.42 sq mi)
- Elevation: 131 m (430 ft)
- Highest elevation: 157 m (515 ft)
- Lowest elevation: 72 m (236 ft)
- Population (2021): 629
  - Density: 44.8/km^{2} (116/sq mi)
- Time zone: UTC+01:00 (CET)
  - Summer (DST): UTC+02:00 (CEST)
- Postal code: 79370
- ^{1} French Land Register data, which excludes lakes, ponds, glaciers > 1 km^{2} (0.386 sq mi or 247 acres) and river estuaries.

Aigonnay (French pronunciation: [ɛɡɔnɛ]) is a former commune in the Deux-Sèvres department in the Nouvelle-Aquitaine region in western France. On 1 January 2019, it was merged into the new commune of Aigondigné.

== Population ==
Historical population
Year	Pop.	±% p.a.
2006	590	—
2011	616	+0.87%
2015	643	+1.08%
2021	629	−0.37%
Source: INSEE

== See also ==
- Communes of the Deux-Sèvres department
