= Beaussais =

Commune in Deux-Sèvres, France

- Part of Beaussais-Vitré
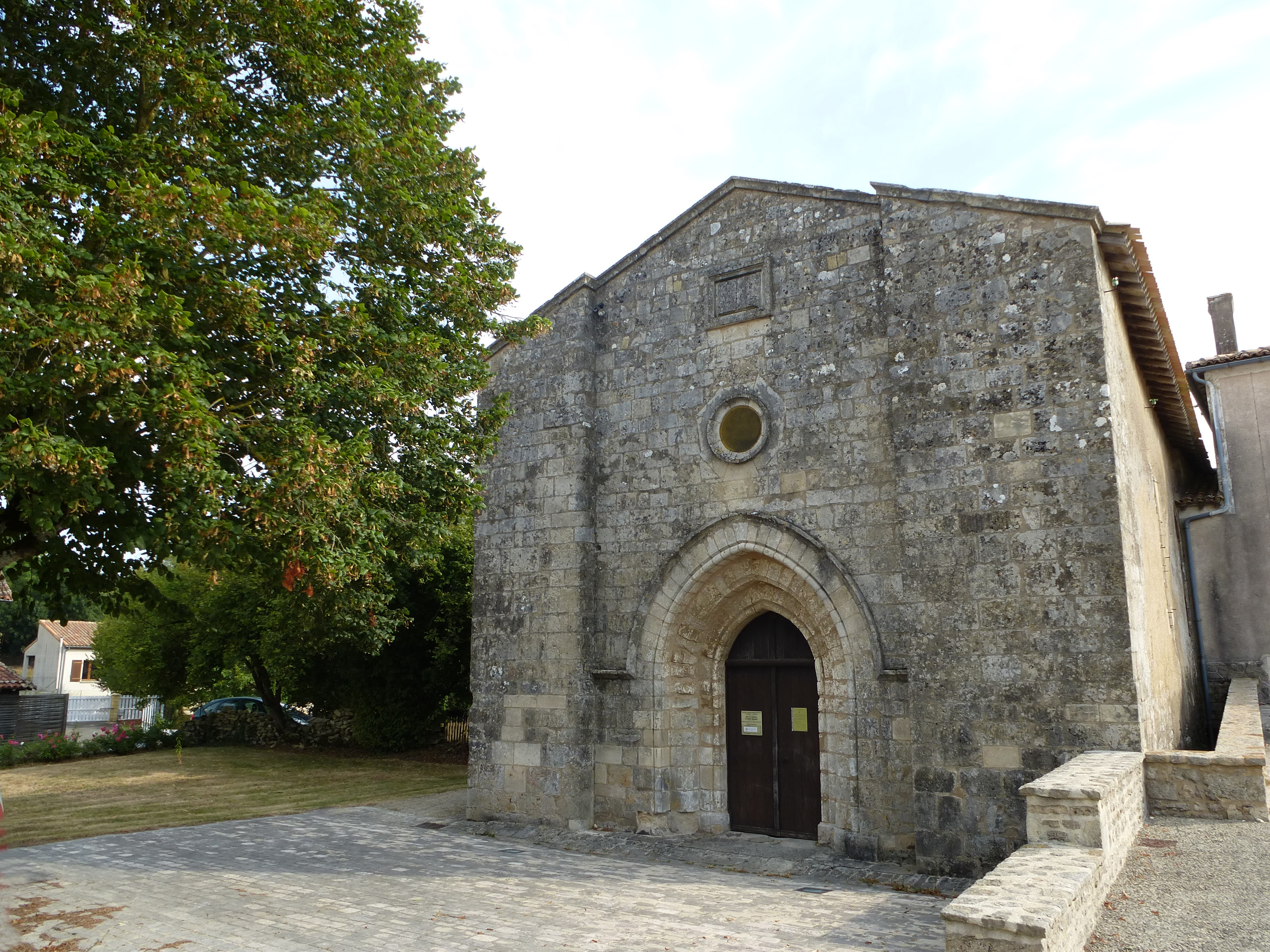
- The Protestant temple in Beaussais
- Location of Beaussais
- Location within France Location within Nouvelle-Aquitaine
- Coordinates: 46°17′28″N 0°09′06″W
- Country: France
- Region: Nouvelle-Aquitaine
- Department: Deux-Sèvres
- Arrondissement: Niort
- Canton: Celles-sur-Belle
- Commune: Beaussais-Vitré
- Area^{1}: 15.75 km^{2} (6.08 sq mi)
- Elevation: 150 m (490 ft)
- Highest elevation: 187 m (614 ft)
- Lowest elevation: 112 m (367 ft)
- Population (2019): 439
  - Density: 27.9/km^{2} (72.2/sq mi)
- Time zone: UTC+01:00 (CET)
  - Summer (DST): UTC+02:00 (CEST)
- Postal code: 79370
- ^{1} French Land Register data, which excludes lakes, ponds, glaciers > 1 km^{2} (0.386 sq mi or 247 acres) and river estuaries.

Beaussais (French pronunciation: [bosɛ]) is a former commune in the Deux-Sèvres department in the Nouvelle-Aquitaine region in western France. It merged into the new commune of Beaussais-Vitré on 1 January 2013.

== See also ==
- Communes of the Deux-Sèvres department
