= Prailles-La Couarde =

- Commune
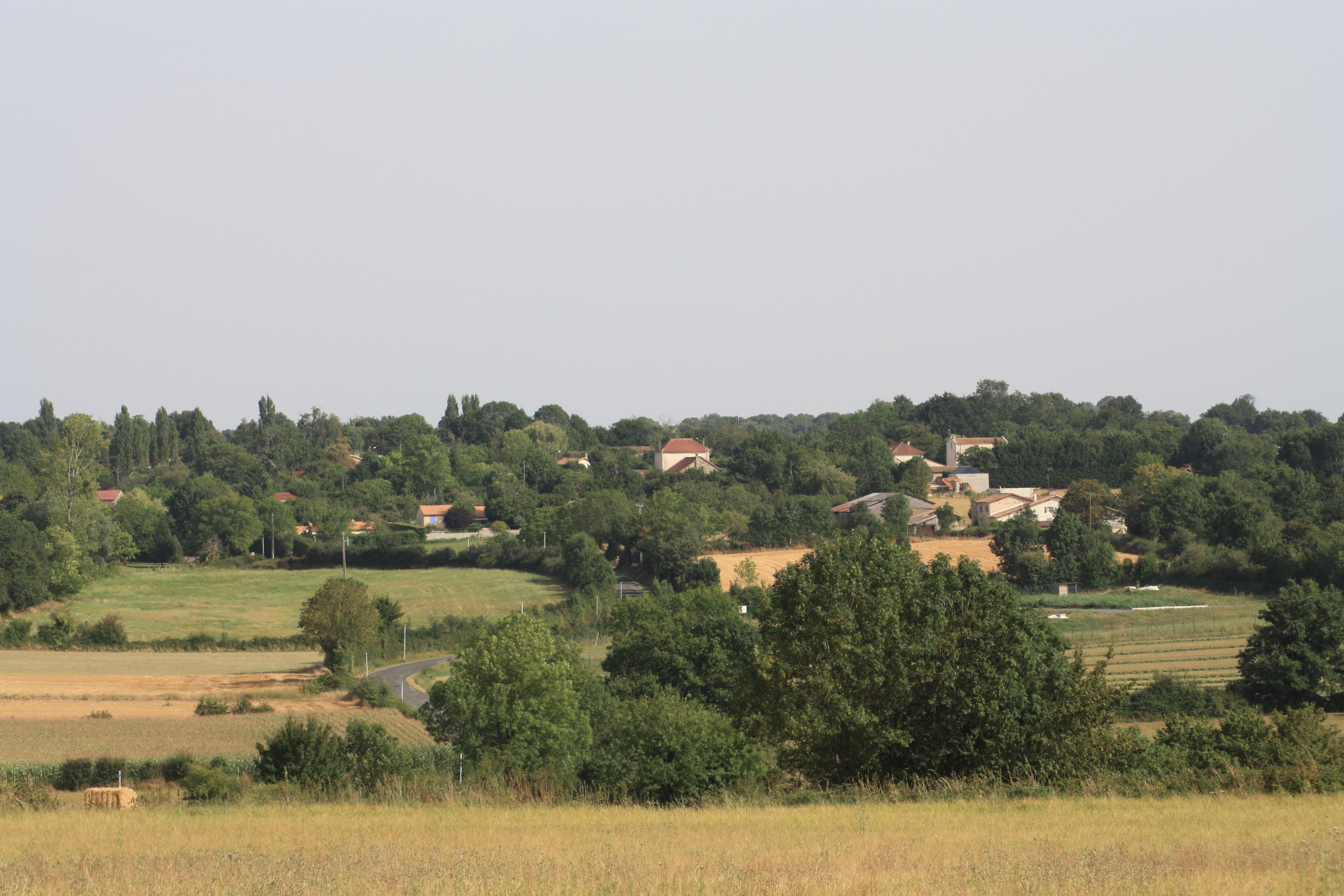
- A general view of Prailles
- Location of Prailles-La Couarde
- Location within France Location within Nouvelle-Aquitaine
- Coordinates: 46°19′28″N 0°13′02″W
- Country: France
- Region: Nouvelle-Aquitaine
- Department: Deux-Sèvres
- Arrondissement: Niort
- Canton: Celles-sur-Belle
- Intercommunality: Mellois-en-Poitou

Government
  - Mayor (2020–2026): Roselyne Demion-Jacinto
- Area^{1}: 35.22 km^{2} (13.60 sq mi)
- Highest elevation: 189 m (620 ft)
- Lowest elevation: 98 m (322 ft)
- Population (2023): 929
  - Density: 26.4/km^{2} (68.3/sq mi)
- Time zone: UTC+01:00 (CET)
  - Summer (DST): UTC+02:00 (CEST)
- INSEE/Postal code: 79217 /79370
- ^{1} French Land Register data, which excludes lakes, ponds, glaciers > 1 km^{2} (0.386 sq mi or 247 acres) and river estuaries.

Prailles-La Couarde (French pronunciation: [pʁaj la kwaʁd]) is a commune in the Deux-Sèvres department in western France. It was established on 1 January 2019 by merger of the former communes of Prailles (the seat) and La Couarde.

== See also ==
- Communes of the Deux-Sèvres department
