= Chey, Deux-Sèvres =

Chey
- Commune
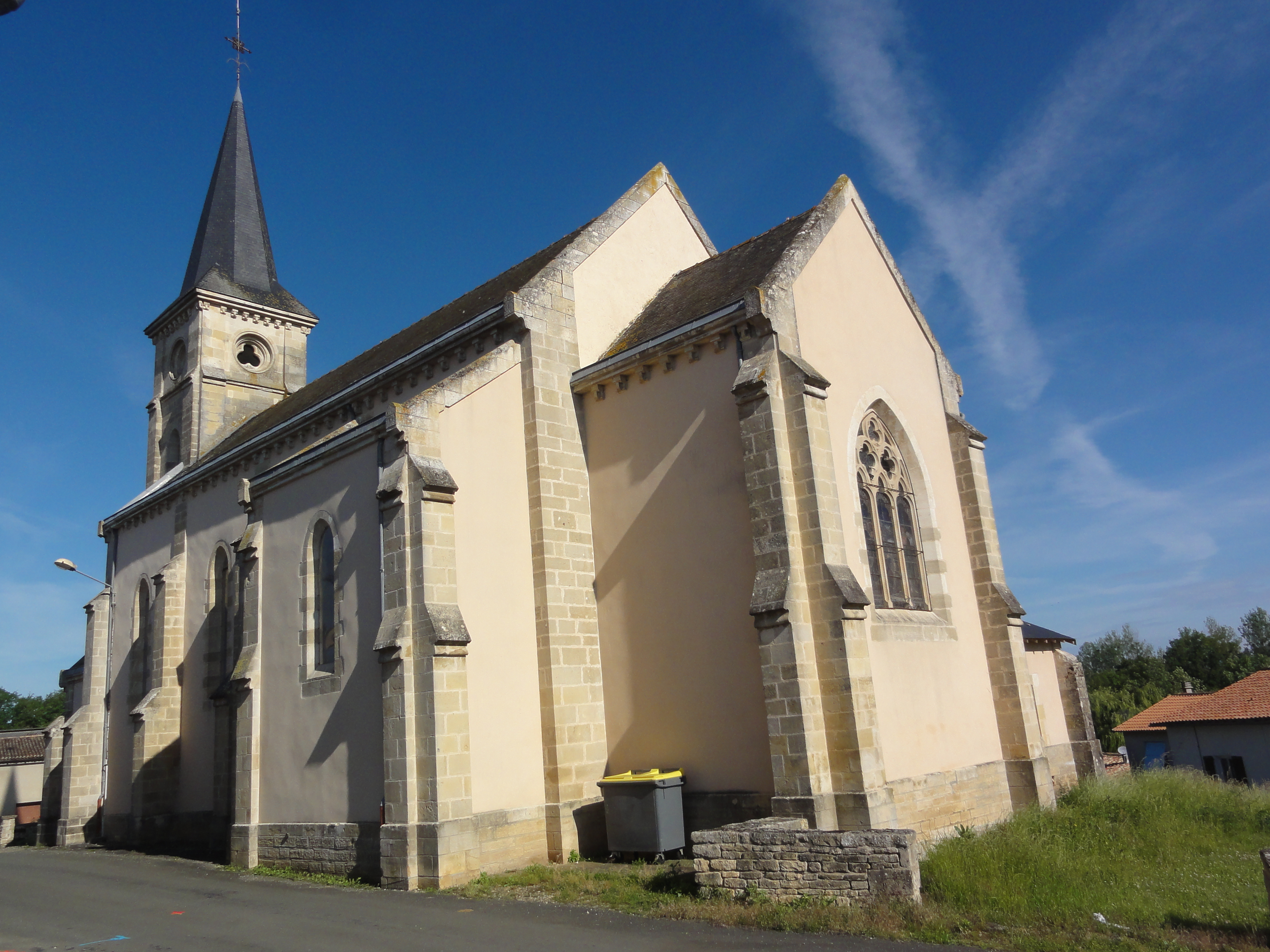
- The church in Chey
- Location of Chey
- Location within France Location within Nouvelle-Aquitaine
- Coordinates: 46°18′17″N 0°02′57″W
- Country: France
- Region: Nouvelle-Aquitaine
- Department: Deux-Sèvres
- Arrondissement: Niort
- Canton: Celles-sur-Belle

Government
  - Mayor (2020–2026): Jean-Christophe Magnan
- Area^{1}: 22 km^{2} (8.5 sq mi)
- Elevation: 132 m (433 ft)
- Highest elevation: 171 m (561 ft)
- Lowest elevation: 130 m (430 ft)
- Population (2023): 541
  - Density: 25/km^{2} (64/sq mi)
- Time zone: UTC+01:00 (CET)
  - Summer (DST): UTC+02:00 (CEST)
- INSEE/Postal code: 79087 /79120
- ^{1} French Land Register data, which excludes lakes, ponds, glaciers > 1 km^{2} (0.386 sq mi or 247 acres) and river estuaries.

Chey is a commune in the Deux-Sèvres department in the Nouvelle-Aquitaine region in western France. In 2020, the population was 554.

== See also ==
- Communes of the Deux-Sèvres department
