= Vanzay =

- Commune
- Location of Vanzay
- Location within France Location within Nouvelle-Aquitaine
- Coordinates: 46°13′58″N 0°06′25″E
- Country: France
- Region: Nouvelle-Aquitaine
- Department: Deux-Sèvres
- Arrondissement: Niort
- Canton: Celles-sur-Belle

Government
  - Mayor (2020–2026): François Brossard
- Area^{1}: 11.4 km^{2} (4.4 sq mi)
- Elevation: 131 m (430 ft)
- Highest elevation: 145 m (476 ft)
- Lowest elevation: 126 m (413 ft)
- Population (2023): 234
  - Density: 20.5/km^{2} (53.2/sq mi)
- Time zone: UTC+01:00 (CET)
  - Summer (DST): UTC+02:00 (CEST)
- INSEE/Postal code: 79338 /79120
- ^{1} French Land Register data, which excludes lakes, ponds, glaciers > 1 km^{2} (0.386 sq mi or 247 acres) and river estuaries.

Vanzay (French pronunciation: [vɑ̃zɛ]) is a commune in the Deux-Sèvres department in western France.

== See also ==
- Communes of the Deux-Sèvres department
