= Thorigné =

- Part of Aigondigné
- Location of Thorigné
- Location within France Location within Nouvelle-Aquitaine
- Coordinates: 46°17′31″N 0°15′05″W
- Country: France
- Region: Nouvelle-Aquitaine
- Department: Deux-Sèvres
- Arrondissement: Niort
- Canton: Celles-sur-Belle
- Commune: Aigondigné
- Area^{1}: 18.26 km^{2} (7.05 sq mi)
- Elevation: 91 m (299 ft)
- Highest elevation: 144 m (472 ft)
- Lowest elevation: 78 m (256 ft)
- Population (2022): 1,214
  - Density: 66.48/km^{2} (172.2/sq mi)
- Time zone: UTC+01:00 (CET)
  - Summer (DST): UTC+02:00 (CEST)
- Postal code: 79370
- ^{1} French Land Register data, which excludes lakes, ponds, glaciers > 1 km^{2} (0.386 sq mi or 247 acres) and river estuaries.

Thorigné (French pronunciation: [tɔʁiɲe]) is a former commune in the Deux-Sèvres department in western France. On 1 January 2017, it was merged into the short-lived commune Mougon-Thorigné, that was merged into the new commune Aigondigné on 1 January 2019.

== Population ==
Historical population
Year	Pop.	±% p.a.
2006	1,142	—
2011	1,276	+2.24%
2022	1,214	−0.45%
Source: INSEE

== See also ==
- Communes of the Deux-Sèvres department
