= Sainte-Soline =

- Commune
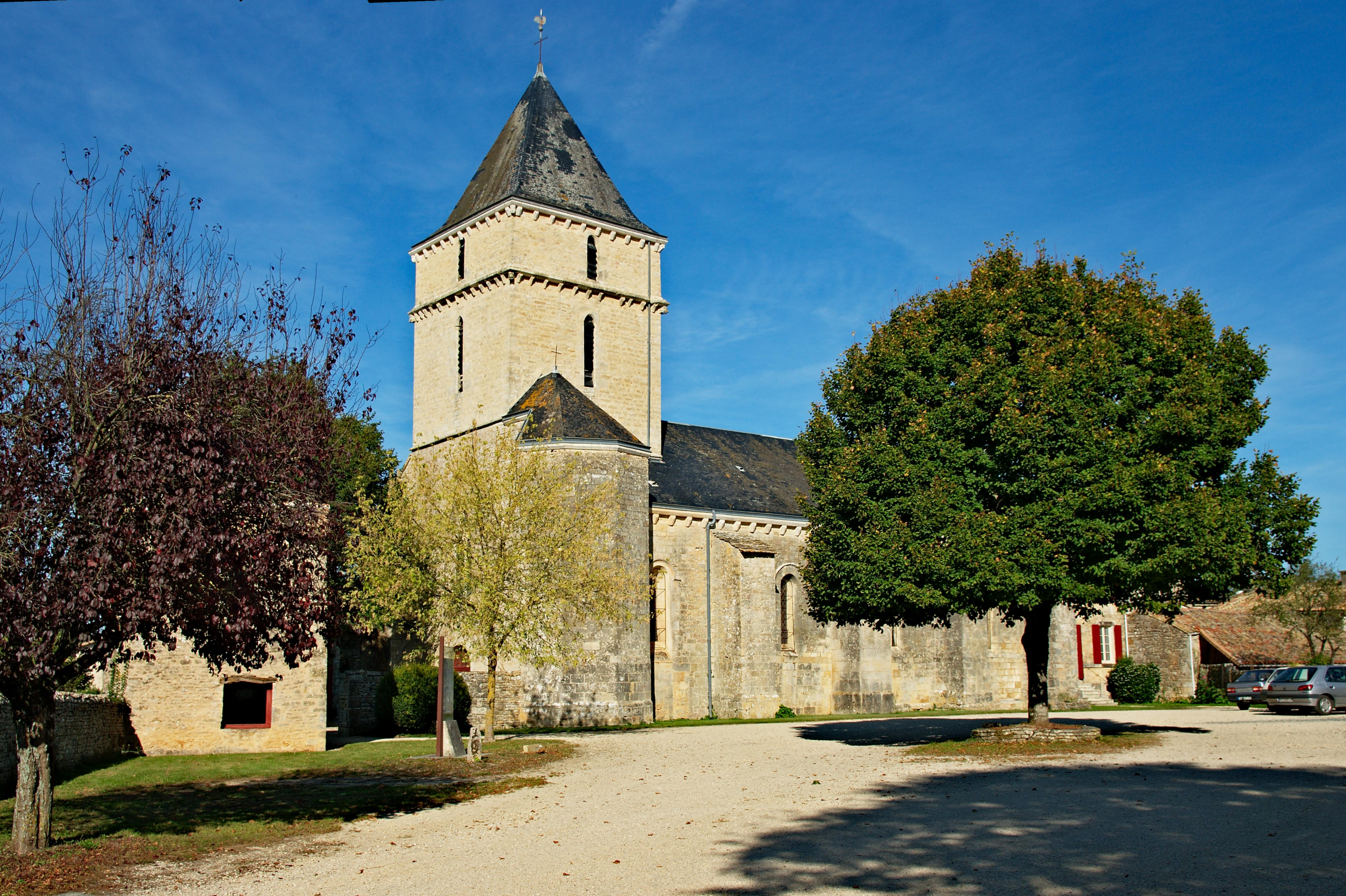
- The church of Sainte-Maixent, Sainte-Soline
- Location of Sainte-Soline
- Location within France Location within Nouvelle-Aquitaine
- Coordinates: 46°14′50″N 0°02′13″E
- Country: France
- Region: Nouvelle-Aquitaine
- Department: Deux-Sèvres
- Arrondissement: Niort
- Canton: Celles-sur-Belle

Government
  - Mayor (2020–2026): Julien Chassin
- Area^{1}: 25.65 km^{2} (9.90 sq mi)
- Elevation: 128 m (420 ft)
- Highest elevation: 145 m (476 ft)
- Lowest elevation: 117 m (384 ft)
- Population (2023): 343
  - Density: 13.4/km^{2} (34.6/sq mi)
- Demonym(s): Solinois, Solinoise
- Time zone: UTC+01:00 (CET)
  - Summer (DST): UTC+02:00 (CEST)
- INSEE/Postal code: 79297 /79120
- ^{1} French Land Register data, which excludes lakes, ponds, glaciers > 1 km^{2} (0.386 sq mi or 247 acres) and river estuaries.

Sainte-Soline (French pronunciation: [sɛ̃t sɔlin]) is a commune in the French department of Deux-Sèvres, New Aquitaine, western metropolitan France.

== See also ==
- Communes of the Deux-Sèvres department
