= Rom, Deux-Sèvres =

Rom
- Commune
- Location of Rom
- Location within France Location within Nouvelle-Aquitaine
- Coordinates: 46°17′38″N 0°06′59″E
- Country: France
- Region: Nouvelle-Aquitaine
- Department: Deux-Sèvres
- Arrondissement: Niort
- Canton: Celles-sur-Belle

Government
  - Mayor (2020–2026): Gilles Pichon
- Area^{1}: 52.38 km^{2} (20.22 sq mi)
- Elevation: 115 m (377 ft)
- Highest elevation: 154 m (505 ft)
- Lowest elevation: 110 m (360 ft)
- Population (2023): 802
  - Density: 15.3/km^{2} (39.7/sq mi)
- Time zone: UTC+01:00 (CET)
  - Summer (DST): UTC+02:00 (CEST)
- INSEE/Postal code: 79230 /79120
- ^{1} French Land Register data, which excludes lakes, ponds, glaciers > 1 km^{2} (0.386 sq mi or 247 acres) and river estuaries.

Rom is a commune situated in the Deux-Sèvres department, in western France.

It was the Roman settlement of Rauranum, located at a ford on a little river on the Roman road between Limonum (Poitiers) and Santonum (Saintes), according to the Antonine Itinerary. At this posting stage or relay stage (mutatio), fresh horses could be found. It lay in the part of Gaul that became Aquitania in Late Antiquity. The Roman site, first rediscovered through aerial photography, is famous for its inscription to Epona. The streets of this vicus were paved with stone, its roofs covered with platelike terracotta tiles. Stone drums that once composed columns have been recovered in fields near the present parish church and built into the wall of its cemetery. Finds from excavations are presented in a format designed for children in the Musée de Rauranum, place de l'Église.

== Geography ==
Rom is a commune situated in the south-eastern part of Deux-Sévres, in the canton of Celles-sur-Belle. It is 50 km away from Niort. The river Dive (also: "Dive du Sud"), a tributary of the Clain, passes through the commune.

== See also ==
- Communes of the Deux-Sèvres department
