= Emmanuel-Marie-Stanislas Thibaut de La Rochethulon =

French politician (1832–1890)

- Born: 17 January 1832; Orléans, Loiret, France
- Died: 14 October 1890 (aged 58); Marigny-Brizay, Vienne, France
- Occupation: Politician
- Parent(s): Emmanuel-Philippe Thibaud de Noblet; Marie-Régine-Olivie de Durfort-Civrac de Lorge
- Relatives: Claude-René Thibaut de Noblet de La Rochethulon (paternal grandfather)

Emmanuel-Marie-Stanislas Thibaut de La Rochethulon (1832–1890) was a French politician. He served as a member of the Chamber of Deputies from 1871 to 1876.
