= Bougon =

- Commune
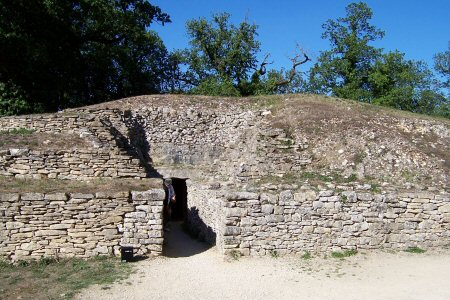
- The tumulus in Bougon

- Coat of arms
- Location of Bougon
- Location within France Location within Nouvelle-Aquitaine
- Coordinates: 46°21′55″N 0°03′30″W
- Country: France
- Region: Nouvelle-Aquitaine
- Department: Deux-Sèvres
- Arrondissement: Niort
- Canton: Celles-sur-Belle

Government
  - Mayor (2020–2026): Bernard Comte
- Area^{1}: 11.7 km^{2} (4.5 sq mi)
- Elevation: 104 m (341 ft)
- Highest elevation: 137 m (449 ft)
- Lowest elevation: 80 m (260 ft)
- Population (2023): 169
  - Density: 14.4/km^{2} (37.4/sq mi)
- Time zone: UTC+01:00 (CET)
  - Summer (DST): UTC+02:00 (CEST)
- INSEE/Postal code: 79042 /79800
- ^{1} French Land Register data, which excludes lakes, ponds, glaciers > 1 km^{2} (0.386 sq mi or 247 acres) and river estuaries.

Bougon (French pronunciation: [buɡɔ̃]) is a commune in the Deux-Sèvres department in the Nouvelle-Aquitaine region in western France.

== Etymology ==
The origin of the name comes from the ancient Gaul Bullicone

== See also ==
- Communes of the Deux-Sèvres department
