= Philibert-Emmanuel de Froulay, chevalier de Tessé =

French baron and army commander (1651–1701)

Philibert-Emmanuel de Froulay, chevalier de Tessé (1651 – Cremona, 20 August 1701) was baron d'Ambrières and a French army commander, fighting in the Williamite War in Ireland.

Philibert-Emmanuel de Froulay was the younger brother of René de Froulay, count of Tessé.

He fought in the Franco-Dutch War on several fronts. In 1684, during the War of the Reunions, he served in Flanders. At the outbreak of the Nine Years' War he was sent to fight with his brother in Germany, where he took part in the devastation of the Palatinate. At the end of 1689, he was moved to Flanders.

Made a brigadier of the Dragoons on 10 March 1690, he was promoted to Lieutenant General on 30 January 1691, and sent to Ireland to support King James II in the Williamite War in Ireland.

He was second in command of the Franco-Irish army at the Battle of Aughrim under the Marquis de St Ruth. When Saint-Ruth was killed during the battle, the chevalier de Tessé could not prevent the collapse of his army. He became commander of the French troops during the Siege of Limerick (1691), and signed the Treaty of Limerick for France.

After his return in France he fought many more battles, but died as Maréchal de camp from dysentery near Cremona on 20 August 1701.

== Sources ==
Mémoires et lettres du maréchal de Tessé
