= Saint-Coutant, Deux-Sèvres =

Saint-Coutant
- Commune
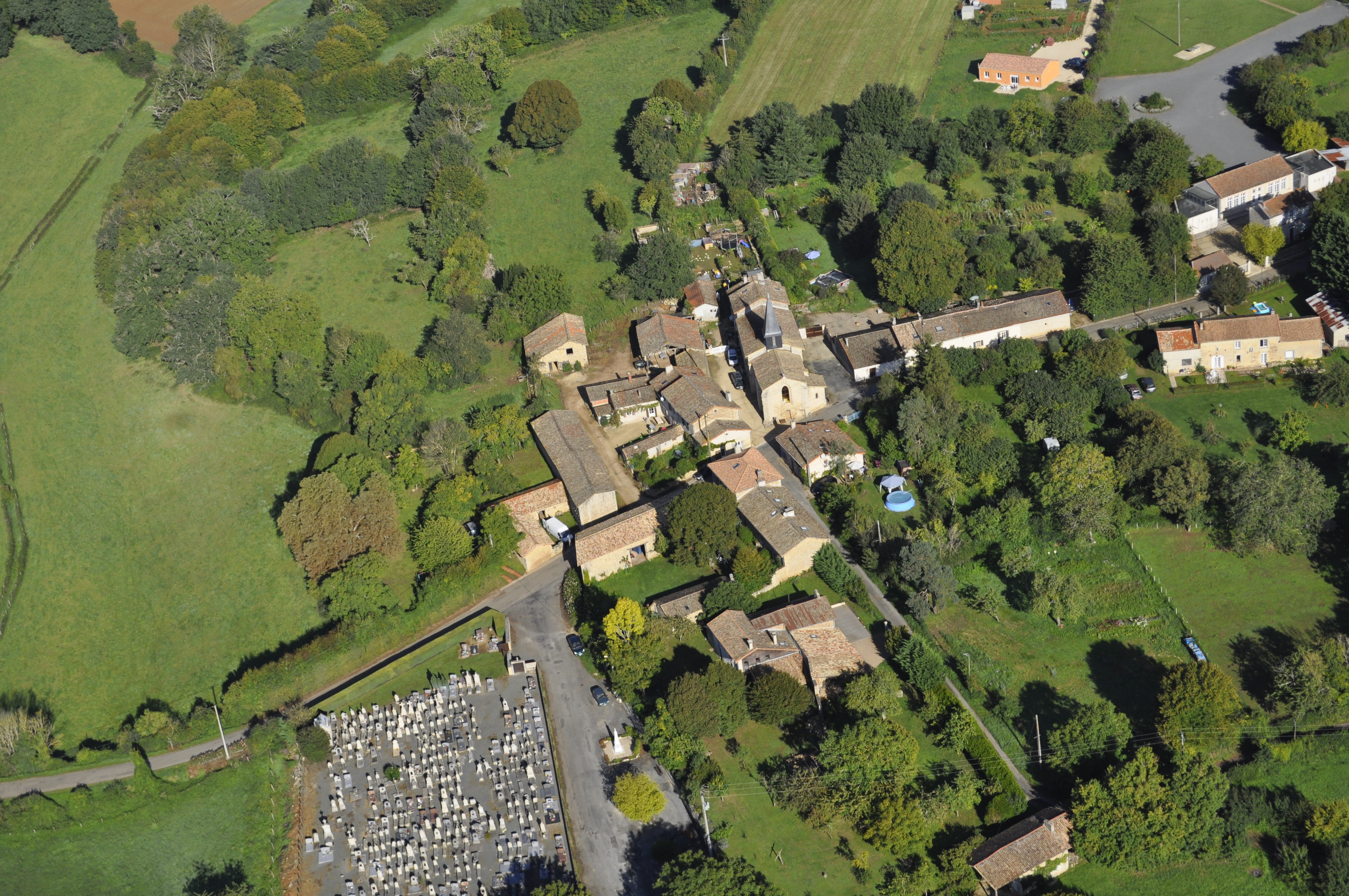
- Aerial view of the church and village
- Location of Saint-Coutant
- Location within France Location within Nouvelle-Aquitaine
- Coordinates: 46°13′48″N 0°00′41″W
- Country: France
- Region: Nouvelle-Aquitaine
- Department: Deux-Sèvres
- Arrondissement: Niort
- Canton: Celles-sur-Belle

Government
  - Mayor (2020–2026): Odile Thellier
- Area^{1}: 11.94 km^{2} (4.61 sq mi)
- Elevation: 286 m (938 ft)
- Highest elevation: 164 m (538 ft)
- Lowest elevation: 124 m (407 ft)
- Population (2023): 273
  - Density: 22.9/km^{2} (59.2/sq mi)
- Time zone: UTC+01:00 (CET)
  - Summer (DST): UTC+02:00 (CEST)
- INSEE/Postal code: 79243 /79120
- ^{1} French Land Register data, which excludes lakes, ponds, glaciers > 1 km^{2} (0.386 sq mi or 247 acres) and river estuaries.

Saint-Coutant (French pronunciation: [sɛ̃ kutɑ̃]) is a commune in the Deux-Sèvres department in western France.

== See also ==
- Communes of the Deux-Sèvres department

== Bibliography ==
- Maurice Poignat, Le Pays mellois (Poitiers: Projet Editions, 1982. ISBN 2-905282-15-0) pp. 264–267
