= Aigondigné =

- Commune
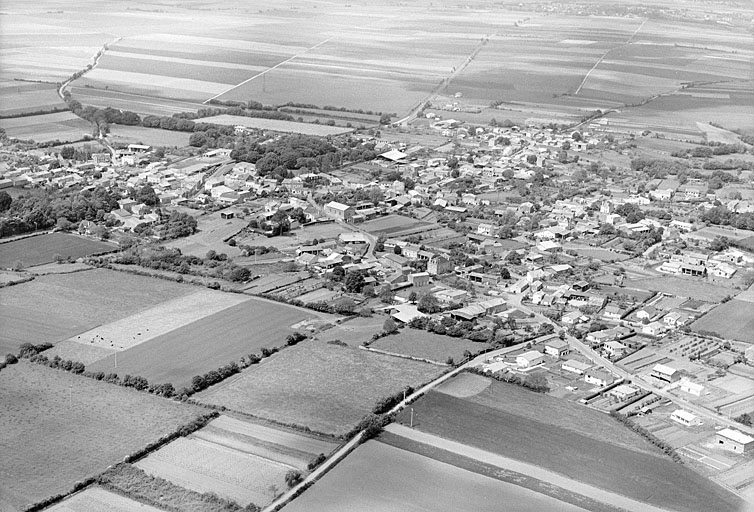
- An aerial view of Mougon
- Location of Aigondigné
- Location within France Location within Nouvelle-Aquitaine
- Coordinates: 46°17′42″N 0°17′10″W
- Country: France
- Region: Nouvelle-Aquitaine
- Department: Deux-Sèvres
- Arrondissement: Niort
- Canton: Celles-sur-Belle
- Intercommunality: Mellois en Poitou

Government
  - Mayor (2020–2026): Patricia Rouxel
- Area^{1}: 69.87 km^{2} (26.98 sq mi)
- Highest elevation: 157 m (515 ft)
- Lowest elevation: 44 m (144 ft)
- Population (2023): 4,710
  - Density: 67.4/km^{2} (175/sq mi)
- Time zone: UTC+01:00 (CET)
  - Summer (DST): UTC+02:00 (CEST)
- INSEE/Postal code: 79185 /79370
- ^{1} French Land Register data, which excludes lakes, ponds, glaciers > 1 km^{2} (0.386 sq mi or 247 acres) and river estuaries.

Aigondigné (French pronunciation: [ɛɡɔ̃diɲe]) is a commune in the department of Deux-Sèvres, western France. The municipality was established on 1 January 2019 by merger of the former communes of Aigonnay, Mougon-Thorigné and Sainte-Blandine. Mougon-Thorigné was the result of the merger, on 1 January 2017, of the former communes of Mougon and Thorigné.

== Population ==
Population data refer to the area corresponding with the commune as of January 2025.

Historical population
Year	Pop.	±% p.a.
1968	2,634	—
1975	2,633	−0.01%
1982	2,901	+1.39%
1990	3,161	+1.08%
1999	3,497	+1.13%
2007	4,252	+2.47%
2012	4,707	+2.05%
2017	4,747	+0.17%
2023	4,710	−0.13%
Source: INSEE

== See also ==
- Communes of the Deux-Sèvres department
