= Lezay =

- Commune
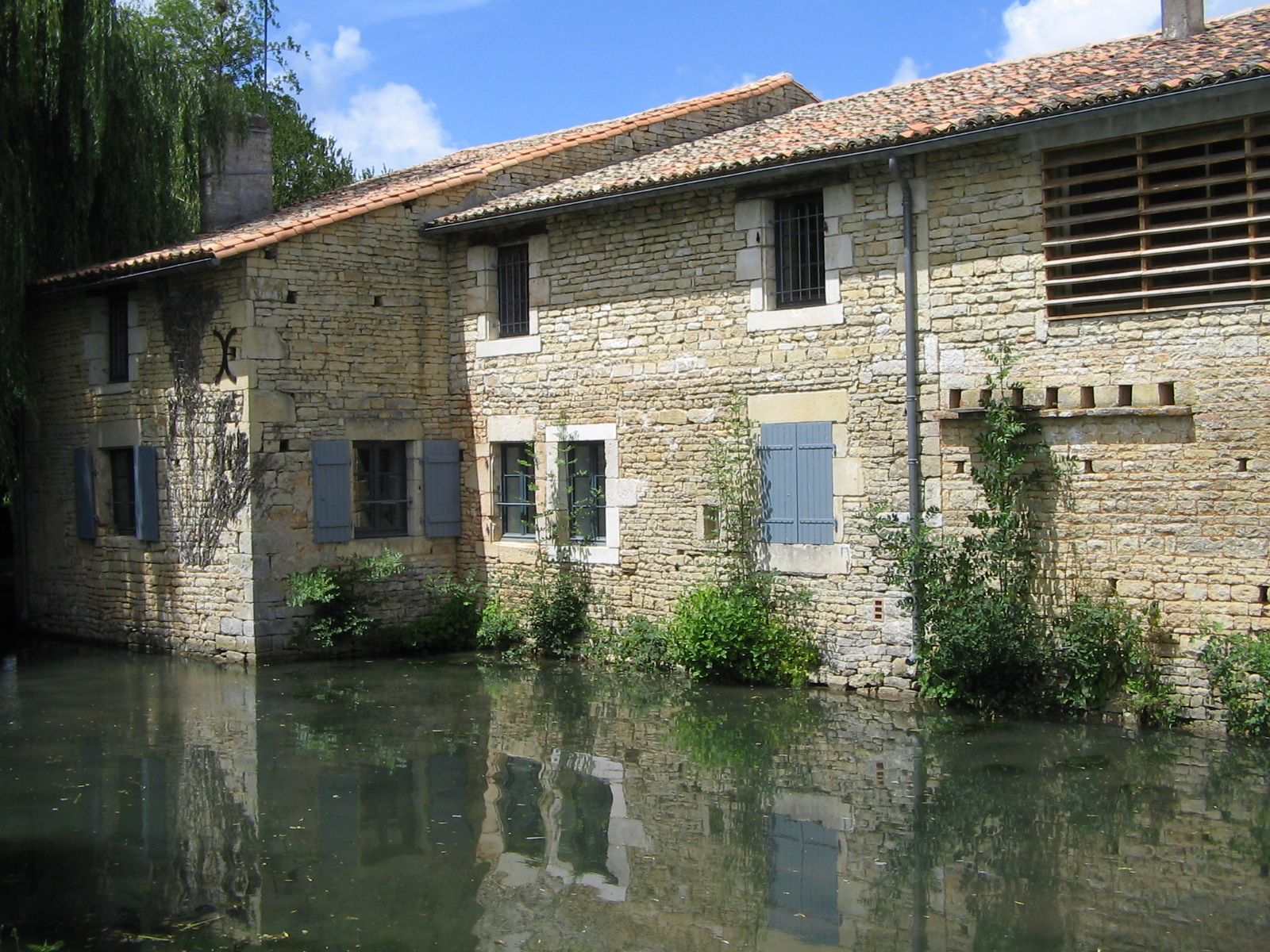
- The mill in Lezay

- Coat of arms
- Location of Lezay
- Location within France Location within Nouvelle-Aquitaine
- Coordinates: 46°15′55″N 0°00′27″W
- Country: France
- Region: Nouvelle-Aquitaine
- Department: Deux-Sèvres
- Arrondissement: Niort
- Canton: Celles-sur-Belle

Government
  - Mayor (2020–2026): Olivier Gayet
- Area^{1}: 45.63 km^{2} (17.62 sq mi)
- Elevation: 124 m (407 ft)
- Highest elevation: 173 m (568 ft)
- Lowest elevation: 118 m (387 ft)
- Population (2023): 2,024
  - Density: 44.36/km^{2} (114.9/sq mi)
- Time zone: UTC+01:00 (CET)
  - Summer (DST): UTC+02:00 (CEST)
- INSEE/Postal code: 79148 /79120
- ^{1} French Land Register data, which excludes lakes, ponds, glaciers > 1 km^{2} (0.386 sq mi or 247 acres) and river estuaries.

Lezay (French pronunciation: [ləzɛ]) is a commune in the Deux-Sèvres department in western France.

== Population ==
Historical population
Year	Pop.	±% p.a.
1968	2,132	—
1975	2,122	−0.07%
1982	2,146	+0.16%
1990	2,295	+0.84%
1999	2,093	−1.02%
2007	2,045	−0.29%
2012	2,087	+0.41%
2017	1,999	−0.86%
2023	2,024	+0.21%
Source: INSEE

== See also ==
- Communes of the Deux-Sèvres department
