= Avon, Deux-Sèvres =

Avon
- Commune
- Coat of arms
- Location of Avon
- Location within France Location within Nouvelle-Aquitaine
- Coordinates: 46°22′39″N 0°01′14″E
- Country: France
- Region: Nouvelle-Aquitaine
- Department: Deux-Sèvres
- Arrondissement: Niort
- Canton: Celles-sur-Belle
- Intercommunality: CC Haut Val Sèvre

Government
  - Mayor (2020–2026): Didier Jollet
- Area^{1}: 12.54 km^{2} (4.84 sq mi)
- Elevation: 141 m (463 ft)
- Highest elevation: 146 m (479 ft)
- Lowest elevation: 97 m (318 ft)
- Population (2023): 63
  - Density: 5.0/km^{2} (13/sq mi)
- Time zone: UTC+01:00 (CET)
  - Summer (DST): UTC+02:00 (CEST)
- INSEE/Postal code: 79023 /79800
- ^{1} French Land Register data, which excludes lakes, ponds, glaciers > 1 km^{2} (0.386 sq mi or 247 acres) and river estuaries.

Avon (French pronunciation: [avɔ̃]) is a commune in the Deux-Sèvres department in the Nouvelle-Aquitaine region in western France.

== See also ==
- Communes of the Deux-Sèvres department
