= Sepvret =

- Commune
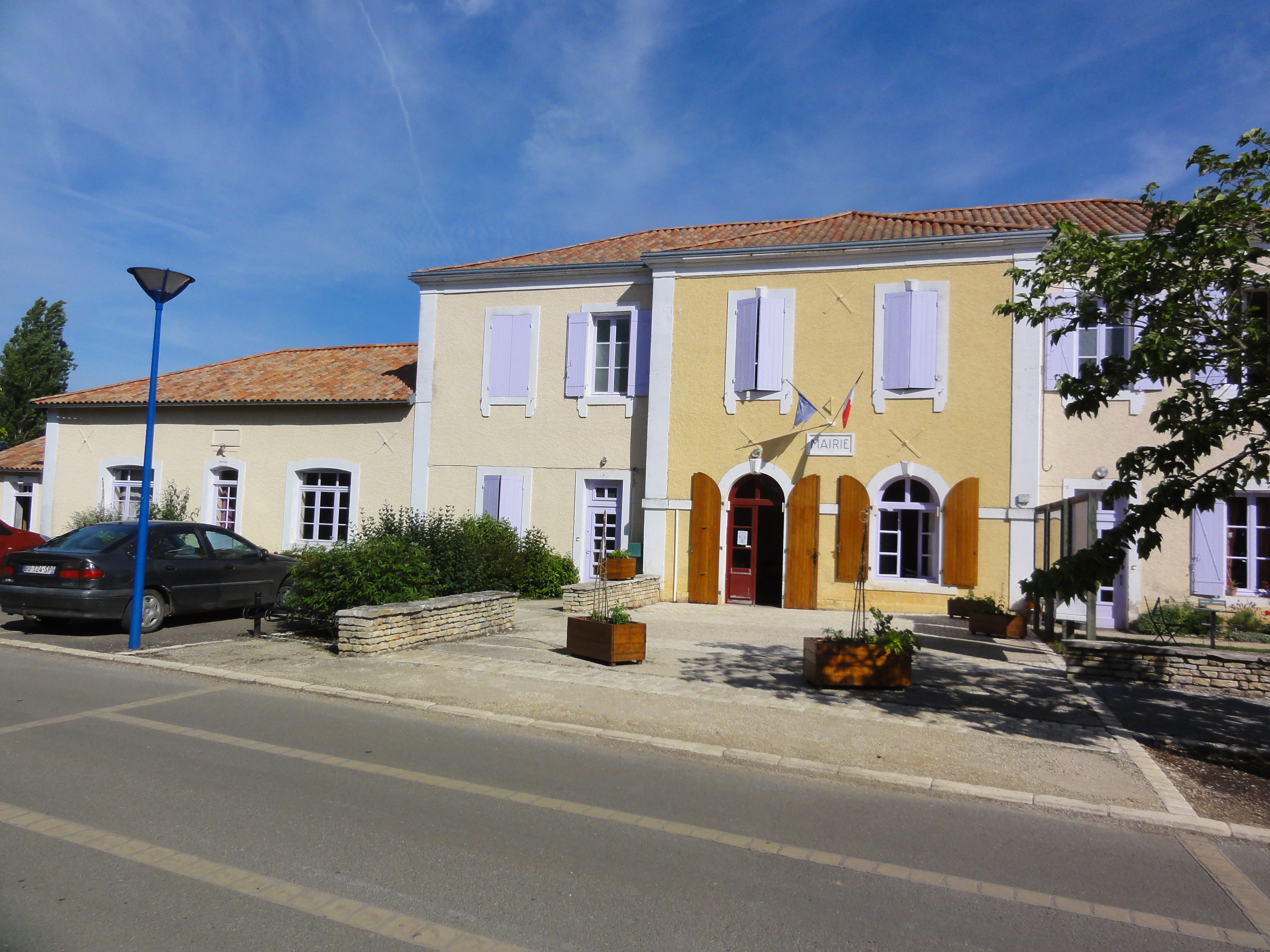
- The town hall in Sepvret
- Location of Sepvret
- Location within France Location within Nouvelle-Aquitaine
- Coordinates: 46°17′14″N 0°05′19″W
- Country: France
- Region: Nouvelle-Aquitaine
- Department: Deux-Sèvres
- Arrondissement: Niort
- Canton: Celles-sur-Belle

Government
  - Mayor (2020–2026): Patrick Charpentier
- Area^{1}: 17.01 km^{2} (6.57 sq mi)
- Elevation: 171 m (561 ft)
- Highest elevation: 194 m (636 ft)
- Lowest elevation: 117 m (384 ft)
- Population (2023): 620
  - Density: 36/km^{2} (94/sq mi)
- Time zone: UTC+01:00 (CET)
  - Summer (DST): UTC+02:00 (CEST)
- INSEE/Postal code: 79313 /79120
- ^{1} French Land Register data, which excludes lakes, ponds, glaciers > 1 km^{2} (0.386 sq mi or 247 acres) and river estuaries.

Sepvret (French pronunciation: [sɛvʁɛ]) is a commune in the Deux-Sèvres department in western France.

== See also ==
- Communes of the Deux-Sèvres department
