= Beaussais-Vitré =

- Commune
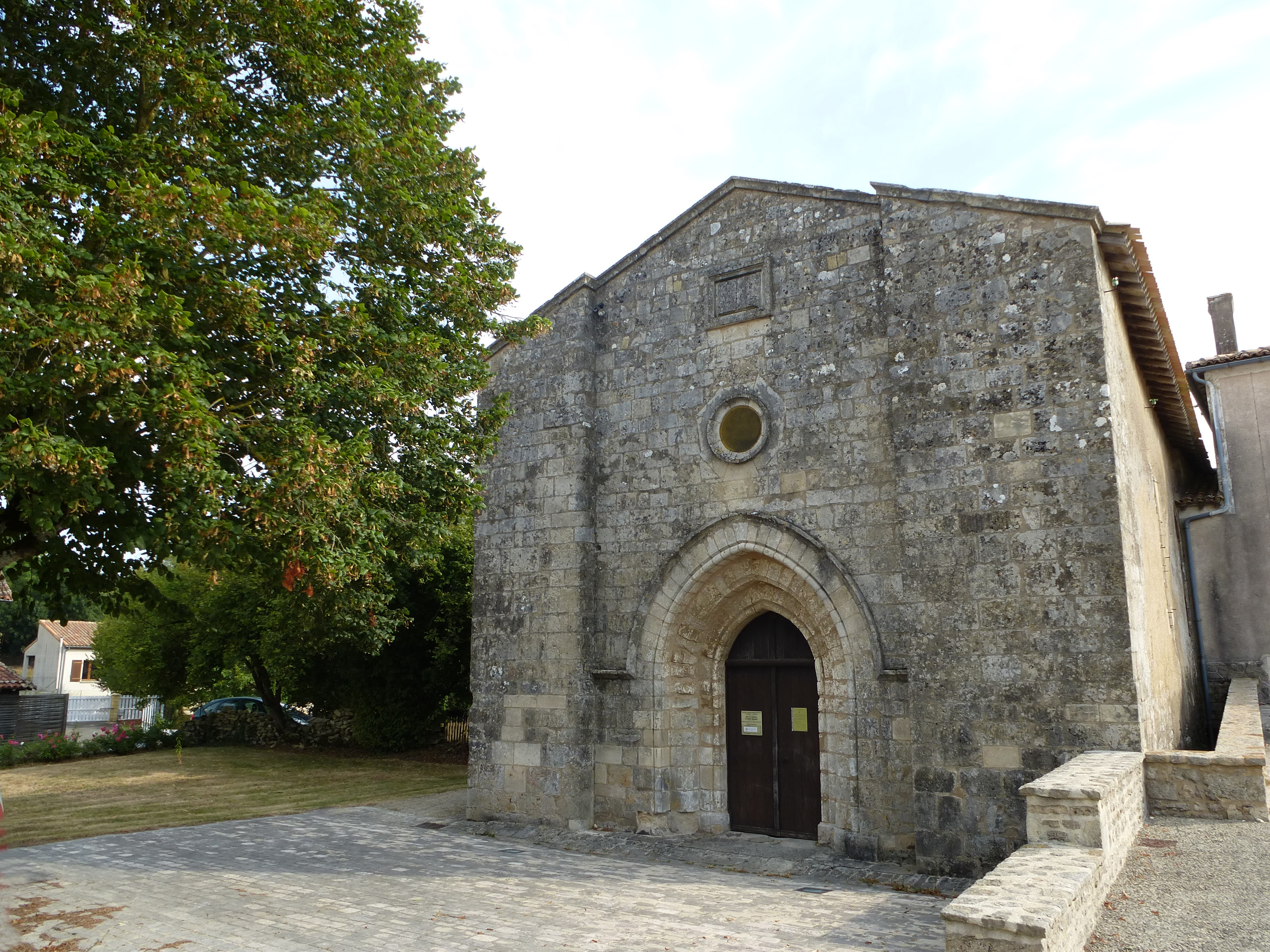
- The temple in Beaussais
- Location of Beaussais-Vitré
- Location within France Location within Nouvelle-Aquitaine
- Coordinates: 46°17′13″N 0°10′12″W
- Country: France
- Region: Nouvelle-Aquitaine
- Department: Deux-Sèvres
- Arrondissement: Niort
- Canton: Celles-sur-Belle

Government
  - Mayor (2020–2026): Nicolas Ferré
- Area^{1}: 25.62 km^{2} (9.89 sq mi)
- Highest elevation: 187 m (614 ft)
- Lowest elevation: 102 m (335 ft)
- Population (2023): 923
  - Density: 36.0/km^{2} (93.3/sq mi)
- Time zone: UTC+01:00 (CET)
  - Summer (DST): UTC+02:00 (CEST)
- INSEE/Postal code: 79030 /79370
- ^{1} French Land Register data, which excludes lakes, ponds, glaciers > 1 km^{2} (0.386 sq mi or 247 acres) and river estuaries.

Beaussais-Vitré (French pronunciation: [bosɛ vitʁe]) is a commune in the Deux-Sèvres department in Nouvelle-Aquitaine region in western France. It is the result of the merger, on 1 January 2013, of the communes of Beaussais and Vitré.

== See also ==
- Communes of the Deux-Sèvres department
