= René de Froulay, Count of Tessé =

French soldier and diplomat (1648–1725)

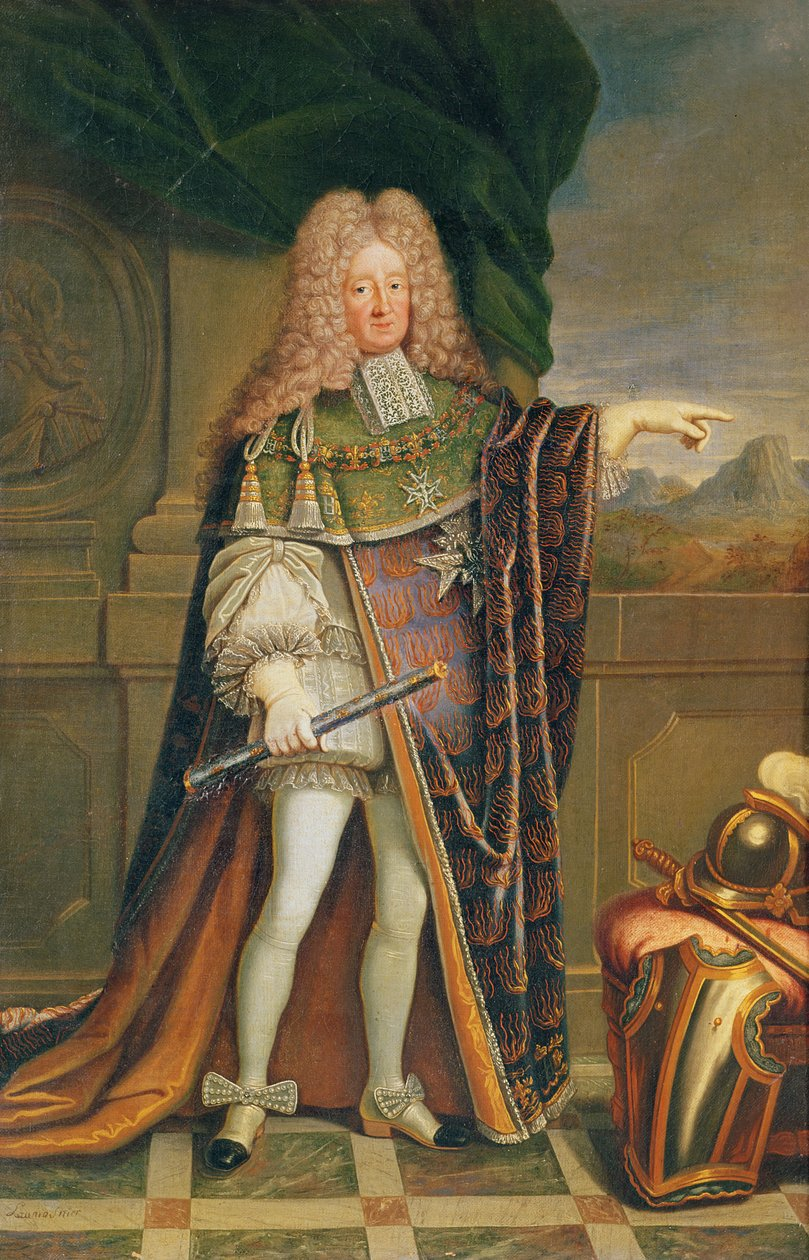
- Portrait by Hyacinthe Rigaud

Ambassador to Spain
- In office 1724–1725

Commander of Bourbon troops in Spain
- In office 1704–1706

Personal details
- Born: 14 May 1648 Le Mans, France
- Died: 30 March 30 March 1725 (aged 76) Yerres
- Relations: Philibert-Emmanuel de Froulay
- Awards: Order of the Golden Collar

Military service
- Years of service: 1669–1707
- Rank: Marshal of France
- Battles/wars: Franco-Dutch War; Nine Years' War; War of the Spanish Succession; Battle of Toulon

René de Froulay, Count of Tessé (14 May 1648 – 30 March 1725) was a French nobleman from Le Mans, who served King Louis XIV as a soldier and diplomat.

== Early life ==
René de Froulay was born at Chateau de Vernie, near Le Mans on 14 May 1648, eldest son of René, Comte de Tessé (1600–1659) and Madeleine de Beaumanoir (1618–1682). His younger brother Philibert-Emmanuel de Froulay (1651–1701) was also a soldier. His maternal grandfather Jean de Beaumanoir, Marquis of Lavardin (1551–1610) was born a Protestant but like many in that period changed sides and religions when needed and ended his career as a trusted advisor of Henry IV.

René married Marie Françoise Auber d'Aunay on 10 June 1674 and they had seven children, four of whom survived childhood. He was succeeded by his eldest son René Mans de Froulay (1681–1746) who married Marie Elisabeth Bouchu in April 1706. (Note: 'René-Mans' was named after de Tessé's home town of Le Mans.)

== Career ==
Like many of his contemporaries, de Tessé played an active role in the wars of Louis XIV; in 1669, he was appointed to the staff of Marshall François de Créquy and raised a regiment of dragoons which took part in the Franco-Dutch War of 1672–1678. (Note: The Tessé Dragoons eventually became the 10 Regiment of Dragoons and was part of the French Army until dissolved in 1962.) After the Revocation of the Edict of Nantes in 1685, he carried out the so-called dragonnade of Huguenots in the Principality of Orange and was military commander of the Dauphiné and Languedoc provinces in 1686.

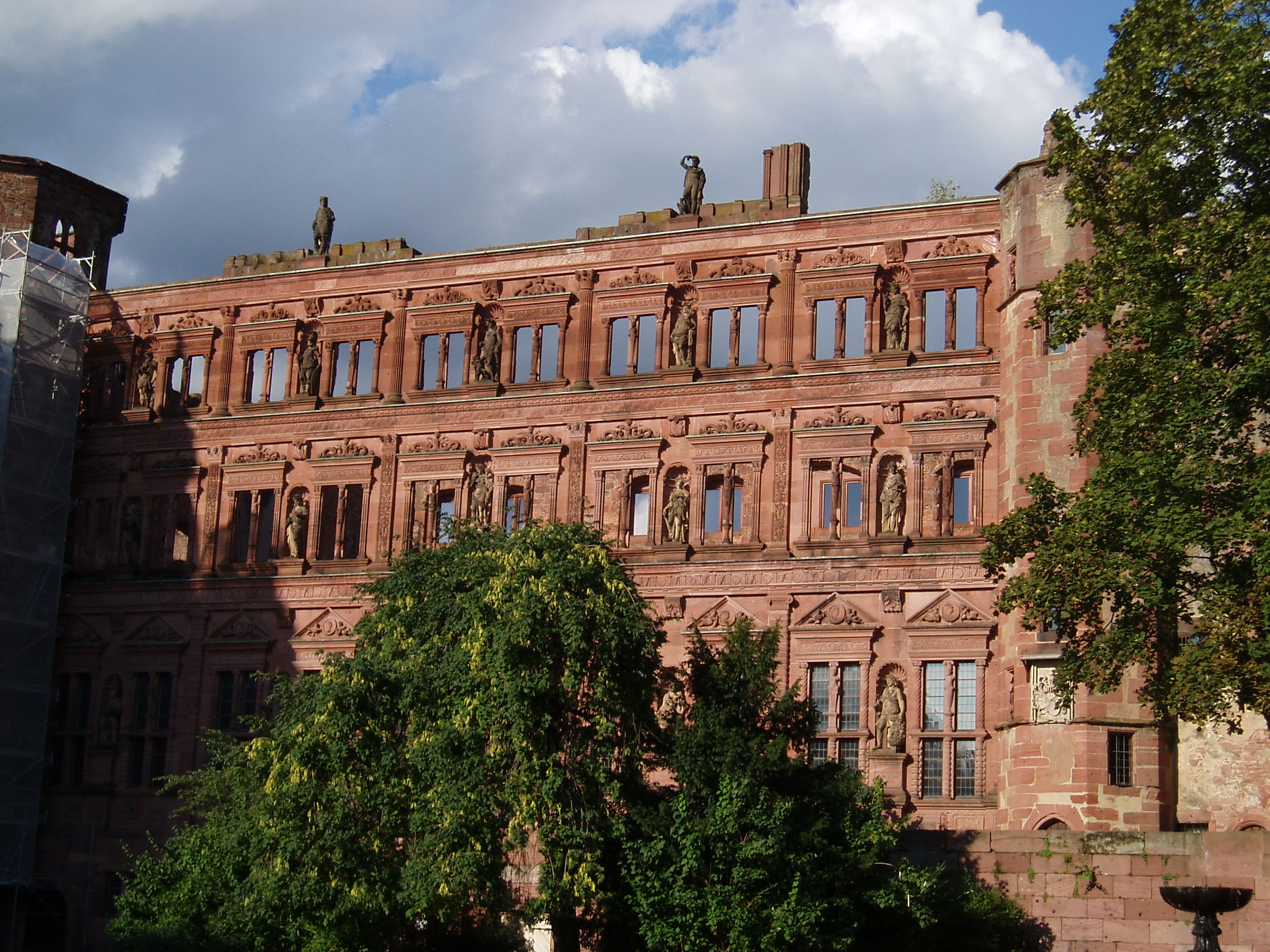
The facade of Heidelberg Castle, destroyed in 1689 and never rebuilt.

At the start of the Nine Years' War in 1688, he was part of the army under Montclar that invaded the Rhineland. When France withdrew in 1689, Louis XIV ordered a scorched-earth policy; de Tessé commanded operations in the Palatinate, including the burning of Heidelberg and destruction of over 20 substantial towns and villages. He later fought in Northern Italy against Savoy, commanding the garrison of the strategic town of Pinerolo in Piedmont. Starting in 1693, he acted as Louis' representative in secret negotiations with Victor Amadeus II that led to the 1696 Treaty of Turin between France and Savoy.

When the War of the Spanish Succession began in 1701, de Tessé commanded the French garrison at Mantua; he was wounded several times, his brother Philibert-Emmanuel dying of dysentery at Cremona the same year. He was appointed Marshal of France in 1703 and in 1704 Commander-in-Chief of Bourbon troops in Spain, replacing the Duke of Berwick. In this role he became close to the young King Philip V.

In 1706, de Tessé commanded Bourbon forces besieging Barcelona but they were over-stretched; British control of the seas made it impossible to prevent the city being resupplied and the Bourbon army was forced to retreat. Despite this, in 1707 he commanded the field army that prevented Prince Eugene taking the key French naval base of Toulon. This appears to have been his last active military command.

In 1708, he was appointed as French Ambassador in Rome, then Spain in 1723, when he persuaded Philip V to resume the Spanish throne after the death of his eldest son Louis I. (Note: Philip was afflicted by fits of manic depression and abdicated in January 1724; when his son died in August the same year, he resumed the throne.) He was also Governor General of the Perche and his home province of Maine. He died in 1725 at the Camaldolese monastery in Grosbois.

== Sources ==
- Comte de Tessé; Mémoires Et Lettres Du Maréchal De Tessé:
- Kamen, Henry; Philip V of Spain: The King Who Reigned Twice; (Yale University Press, 2001);
- Lynn, John; The Wars of Louis XIV, 1667–1714; (Longman, 1999);
- Symcox, Geoffrey; Absolutism in the Savoyard State 1675–1730; (University of California Press, 1983);
