= Chenay, Deux-Sèvres =

Chenay
- Commune
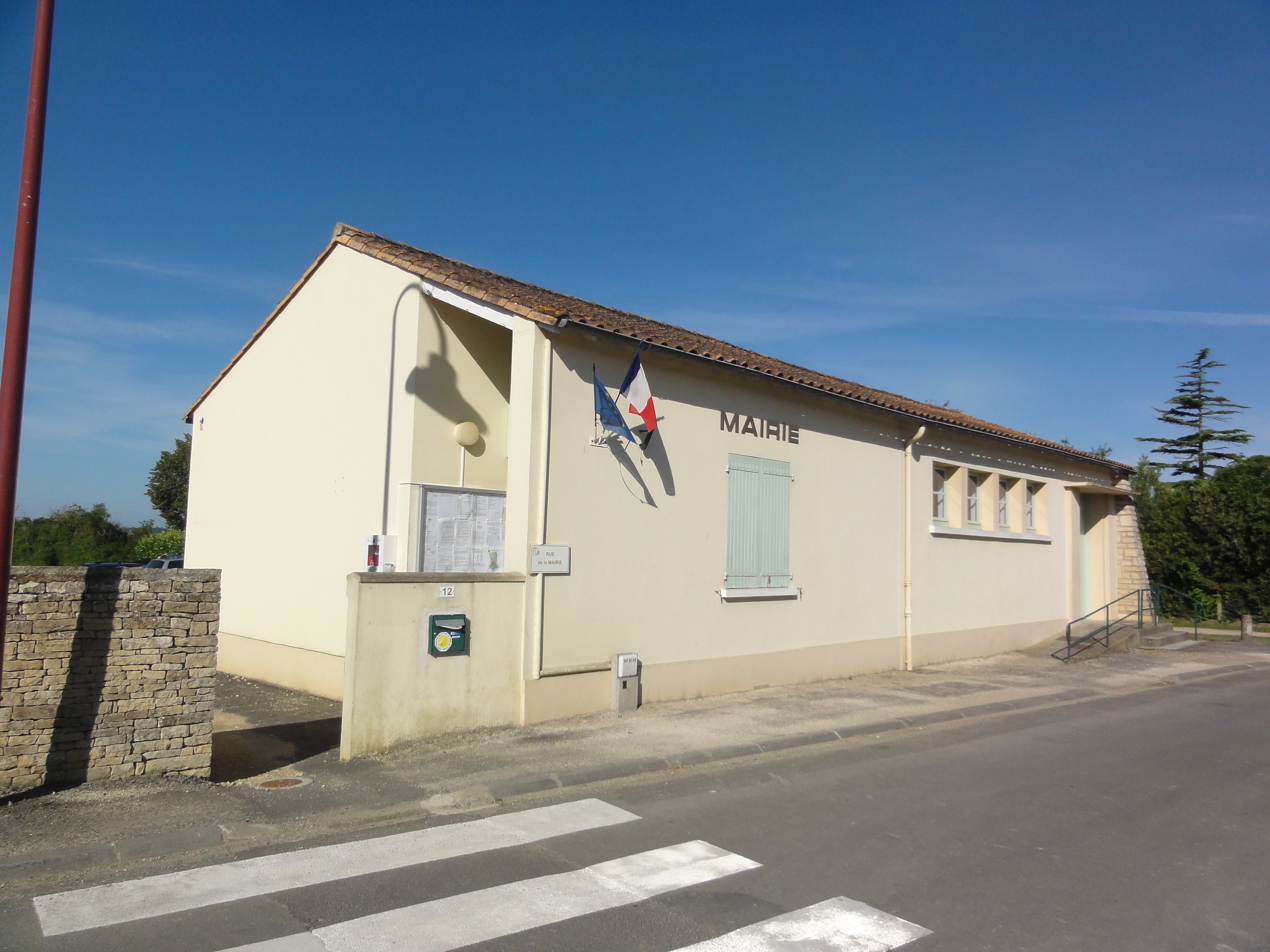
- The town hall in Chenay
- Location of Chenay
- Location within France Location within Nouvelle-Aquitaine
- Coordinates: 46°19′33″N 0°01′58″W
- Country: France
- Region: Nouvelle-Aquitaine
- Department: Deux-Sèvres
- Arrondissement: Niort
- Canton: Celles-sur-Belle

Government
  - Mayor (2021–2026): Nicole Nee
- Area^{1}: 21.7 km^{2} (8.4 sq mi)
- Elevation: 128 m (420 ft)
- Highest elevation: 149 m (489 ft)
- Lowest elevation: 99 m (325 ft)
- Population (2023): 461
  - Density: 21.2/km^{2} (55.0/sq mi)
- Time zone: UTC+01:00 (CET)
  - Summer (DST): UTC+02:00 (CEST)
- INSEE/Postal code: 79084 /79120
- ^{1} French Land Register data, which excludes lakes, ponds, glaciers > 1 km^{2} (0.386 sq mi or 247 acres) and river estuaries.

Chenay (French pronunciation: [ʃənɛ]) is a commune in the Deux-Sèvres department in the Nouvelle-Aquitaine region in western France.

== See also ==
- Communes of the Deux-Sèvres department
