= Soudan, Deux-Sèvres =

Soudan
- Commune
- Location of Soudan
- Location within France Location within Nouvelle-Aquitaine
- Coordinates: 46°25′25″N 0°06′35″W
- Country: France
- Region: Nouvelle-Aquitaine
- Department: Deux-Sèvres
- Arrondissement: Niort
- Canton: Celles-sur-Belle

Government
  - Mayor (2020–2026): Didier Proust
- Area^{1}: 23.29 km^{2} (8.99 sq mi)
- Elevation: 168 m (551 ft)
- Highest elevation: 183 m (600 ft)
- Lowest elevation: 120 m (390 ft)
- Population (2023): 424
  - Density: 18.2/km^{2} (47.2/sq mi)
- Time zone: UTC+01:00 (CET)
  - Summer (DST): UTC+02:00 (CEST)
- INSEE/Postal code: 79316 /79800
- ^{1} French Land Register data, which excludes lakes, ponds, glaciers > 1 km^{2} (0.386 sq mi or 247 acres) and river estuaries.

Soudan (French pronunciation: [sudɑ̃]) is a commune in the Deux-Sèvres department in western France.

== See also ==
- Communes of the Deux-Sèvres department
