= Messé =

- Commune
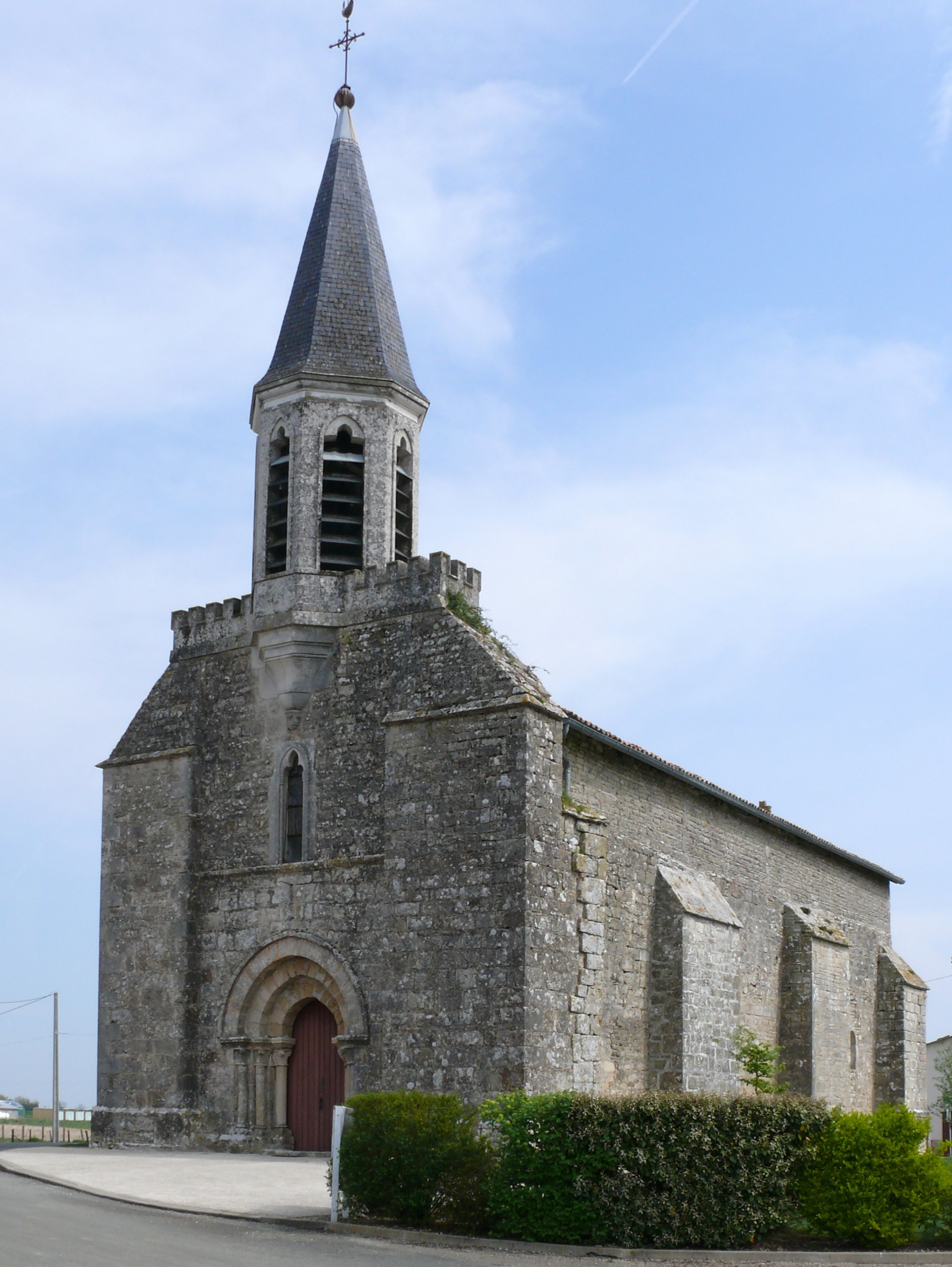
- The church in Messé
- Location of Messé
- Location within France Location within Nouvelle-Aquitaine
- Coordinates: 46°15′55″N 0°06′55″E
- Country: France
- Region: Nouvelle-Aquitaine
- Department: Deux-Sèvres
- Arrondissement: Niort
- Canton: Celles-sur-Belle

Government
  - Mayor (2020–2026): Patrick Dodin
- Area^{1}: 12.31 km^{2} (4.75 sq mi)
- Elevation: 135 m (443 ft)
- Highest elevation: 149 m (489 ft)
- Lowest elevation: 121 m (397 ft)
- Population (2023): 220
  - Density: 18/km^{2} (46/sq mi)
- Time zone: UTC+01:00 (CET)
  - Summer (DST): UTC+02:00 (CEST)
- INSEE/Postal code: 79177 /79120
- ^{1} French Land Register data, which excludes lakes, ponds, glaciers > 1 km^{2} (0.386 sq mi or 247 acres) and river estuaries.

Messé is a commune in the Deux-Sèvres department in western France.

== See also ==
- Communes of the Deux-Sèvres department
