= Vançais =

- Commune
- Location of Vançais
- Location within France Location within Nouvelle-Aquitaine
- Coordinates: 46°18′05″N 0°03′09″E
- Country: France
- Region: Nouvelle-Aquitaine
- Department: Deux-Sèvres
- Arrondissement: Niort
- Canton: Celles-sur-Belle

Government
  - Mayor (2020–2026): Line Bonnet
- Area^{1}: 16.99 km^{2} (6.56 sq mi)
- Elevation: 127 m (417 ft)
- Highest elevation: 139 m (456 ft)
- Lowest elevation: 117 m (384 ft)
- Population (2023): 222
  - Density: 13.1/km^{2} (33.8/sq mi)
- Time zone: UTC+01:00 (CET)
  - Summer (DST): UTC+02:00 (CEST)
- INSEE/Postal code: 79336 /79120
- ^{1} French Land Register data, which excludes lakes, ponds, glaciers > 1 km^{2} (0.386 sq mi or 247 acres) and river estuaries.

Vançais (French pronunciation: [vɑ̃sɛ]) is a commune in the Deux-Sèvres department in western France.

== See also ==
- Communes of the Deux-Sèvres department
