= Saint-Médard, Deux-Sèvres =

Part of Celles-sur-Belle in Nouvelle-Aquitaine, France

Saint-Médard
- Part of Celles-sur-Belle
- Location of Saint-Médard
- Location within France Location within Nouvelle-Aquitaine
- Coordinates: 46°12′50″N 0°16′35″W
- Country: France
- Region: Nouvelle-Aquitaine
- Department: Deux-Sèvres
- Arrondissement: Niort
- Canton: Celles-sur-Belle
- Commune: Celles-sur-Belle
- Area^{1}: 4.13 km^{2} (1.59 sq mi)
- Elevation: 73 m (240 ft)
- Highest elevation: 93 m (305 ft)
- Lowest elevation: 48 m (157 ft)
- Population (2022): 111
  - Density: 26.9/km^{2} (69.6/sq mi)
- Time zone: UTC+01:00 (CET)
  - Summer (DST): UTC+02:00 (CEST)
- Postal code: 79370
- ^{1} French Land Register data, which excludes lakes, ponds, glaciers > 1 km^{2} (0.386 sq mi or 247 acres) and river estuaries.

Saint-Médard (French pronunciation: [sɛ̃ medaʁ]) is a former commune in the Deux-Sèvres department in western France. On 1 January 2019, it was merged into the commune Celles-sur-Belle.

== See also ==
- Communes of the Deux-Sèvres department
