= Fressines =

- Commune
- Location of Fressines
- Location within France Location within Nouvelle-Aquitaine
- Coordinates: 46°19′23″N 0°17′44″W
- Country: France
- Region: Nouvelle-Aquitaine
- Department: Deux-Sèvres
- Arrondissement: Niort
- Canton: Celles-sur-Belle

Government
  - Mayor (2020–2026): Patrice Fouche
- Area^{1}: 9.61 km^{2} (3.71 sq mi)
- Elevation: 115 m (377 ft)
- Highest elevation: 138 m (453 ft)
- Lowest elevation: 62 m (203 ft)
- Population (2023): 1,757
  - Density: 183/km^{2} (474/sq mi)
- Time zone: UTC+01:00 (CET)
  - Summer (DST): UTC+02:00 (CEST)
- INSEE/Postal code: 79129 /79370
- ^{1} French Land Register data, which excludes lakes, ponds, glaciers > 1 km^{2} (0.386 sq mi or 247 acres) and river estuaries.

Fressines is a commune in the Deux-Sèvres department. It is located at the Nouvelle-Aquitaine region, in western France.

== See also ==
- Communes of the Deux-Sèvres department
