= Georges de La Rochethulon =

French politician

- Born: 8 January 1868; Versailles, France
- Died: 14 August 1941 (aged 73); Talmont-Saint-Hilaire, Vendée, France
- Education: Collège Stanislas de Paris
- Alma mater: École spéciale militaire de Saint-Cyr
- Occupation: Politician

Georges de La Rochethulon (1868–1941) was a French politician. He served as a member of the Chamber of Deputies for Vendée from 1902 to 1906.
