= Salles (surname) =

French toponymic surname

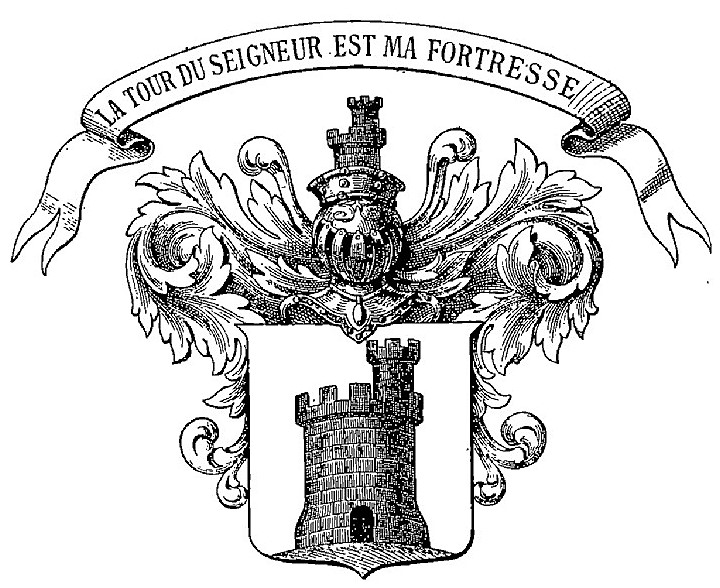
Salles family coat of arms (source: Mémoires de la Société des lettres, sciences et arts de Bar-le-Duc, 1890).

The surname Salles is of French origin and is classified as a toponymic surname, derived from localities named (Les) Salles, found in various regions of France. It is a variant of the French name Salle, a term from Old French salle, which meant "great hall" or "noble room", associated with manor houses or fortified dwellings.

The term originates from the Germanic root salla, which originally referred to a fortified hall and later to a large house or hall. The same root appears in Middle High German as sal. This Germanic etymology was adopted into medieval French vocabulary through the influence of the Frankish and Saxon populations that were established in the Gaulish territory.

The surname Salles is also documented in England as a variation of the English name Sallis, a toponymic name derived from Middle English salwe, referring to places with willow trees (sallow trees), which comes from Old English salh. Although the origins are different, the phonetic similarity favored the graphical convergence of the English form to Salles.

== French noble family ==
The Salles family is a French noble family originating from Normandy, later established in Béarn and, from 1476, in Lorraine. The lineage received noble titles such as Baron of Rorté, Marquis of Bulgnéville, Lord of Gombervaux, and Lord of Vouthon.

Historically, the Salles family held important positions in French civil and military administration, including ambassadors, chamberlains of the Duchy of Lorraine, generals, and state counselors. According to nobiliary records, the lineage was officially recognized as part of the nobility of Lorraine from the 18th century onward.

The family coat of arms is described as follows: D'argent, à la tour donjonnée de sable, le premier donjon sommé d'un autre donjon du même, et posée sur un tertre à trois coupeaux de sinople, depicting a fortified tower on green hills.

Additionally, the Château de Montbras, located in the Meuse region, is often associated with the family and is highlighted in historical and archaeological publications.
