= Salles, Deux-Sèvres =

Salles
- Commune
- Coat of arms
- Location of Salles
- Location within France Location within Nouvelle-Aquitaine
- Coordinates: 46°23′10″N 0°05′54″W
- Country: France
- Region: Nouvelle-Aquitaine
- Department: Deux-Sèvres
- Arrondissement: Niort
- Canton: Celles-sur-Belle

Government
  - Mayor (2020–2026): Régis Billerot
- Area^{1}: 7.77 km^{2} (3.00 sq mi)
- Elevation: 100 m (330 ft)
- Highest elevation: 143 m (469 ft)
- Lowest elevation: 72 m (236 ft)
- Population (2023): 323
  - Density: 41.6/km^{2} (108/sq mi)
- Time zone: UTC+01:00 (CET)
  - Summer (DST): UTC+02:00 (CEST)
- INSEE/Postal code: 79303 /79800
- ^{1} French Land Register data, which excludes lakes, ponds, glaciers > 1 km^{2} (0.386 sq mi or 247 acres) and river estuaries.

Salles (French pronunciation: [sal]) is a commune in the Deux-Sèvres department in western France.

== See also ==
- Communes of the Deux-Sèvres department
