= Claude-René Thibaut de Noblet de La Rochethulon =

French politician

- Born: 8 December 1749; Thorigné, Deux-Sèvres, France
- Died: 27 July 1821 (aged 71); Paris, France
- Occupation: Politician
- Spouse: Marie de Lavardin de Beaumanoir
- Parent(s): Claude-Philippe-Anne Thibaud de Noblet; Elisabeth-Françoise Ysoré de Pleumartin

Claude-René Thibaut de Noblet de La Rochethulon (1749–1821) was a French politician. He served as a member of the Chamber of Deputies from 1815 to 1819.
