= Celles-sur-Belle =

- Commune
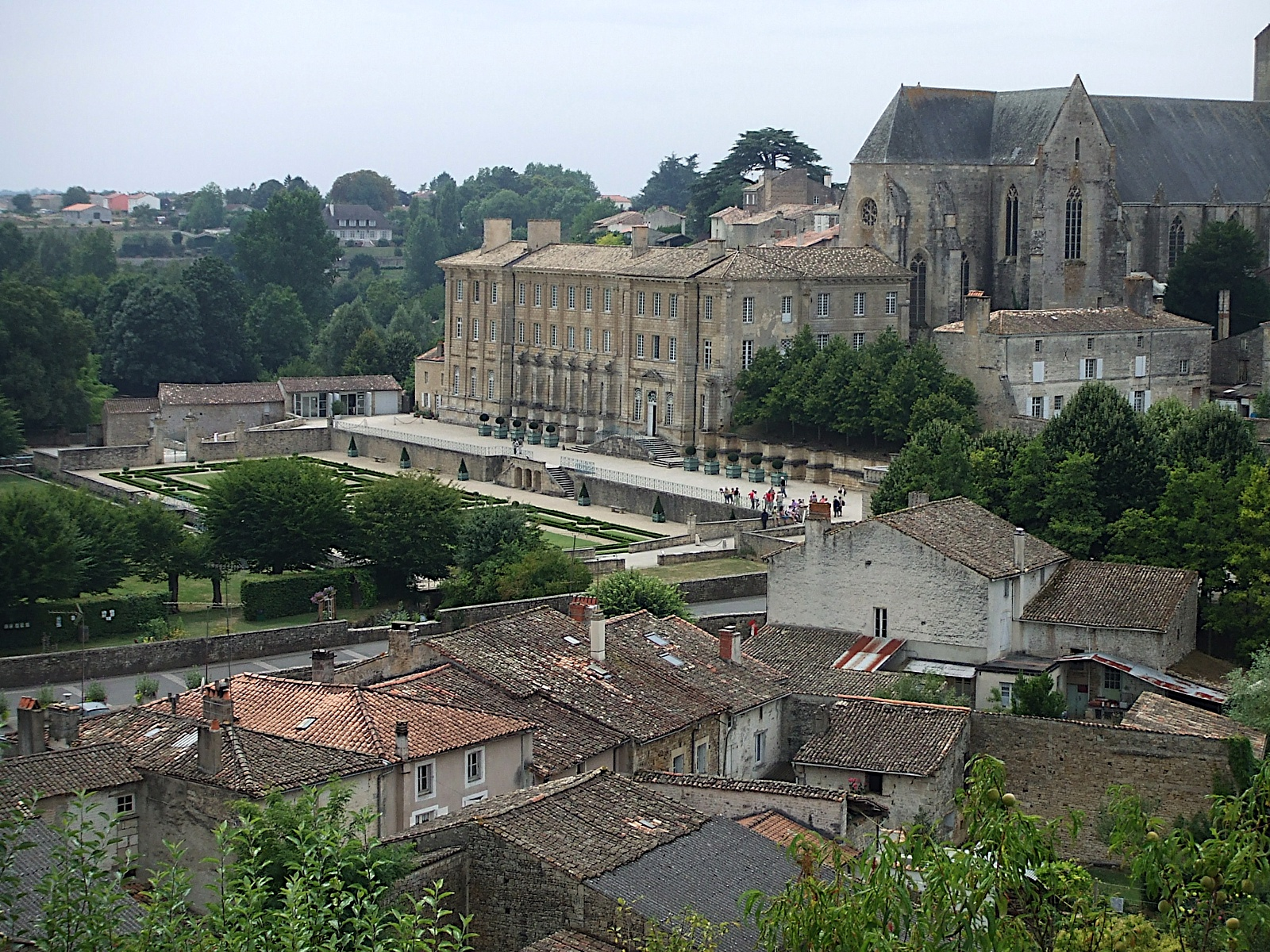
- The royal abbey of Our Lady, in Celles-sur-Belle

- Coat of arms
- Location of Celles-sur-Belle
- Location within France Location within Nouvelle-Aquitaine
- Coordinates: 46°15′46″N 0°12′36″W
- Country: France
- Region: Nouvelle-Aquitaine
- Department: Deux-Sèvres
- Arrondissement: Niort
- Canton: Celles-sur-Belle
- Intercommunality: Mellois en Poitou

Government
  - Mayor (2020–2026): Sylvie Brunet
- Area^{1}: 41.37 km^{2} (15.97 sq mi)
- Highest elevation: 162 m (531 ft)
- Lowest elevation: 60 m (200 ft)
- Population (2023): 3,829
  - Density: 92.55/km^{2} (239.7/sq mi)
- Time zone: UTC+01:00 (CET)
  - Summer (DST): UTC+02:00 (CEST)
- INSEE/Postal code: 79061 /79370
- ^{1} French Land Register data, which excludes lakes, ponds, glaciers > 1 km^{2} (0.386 sq mi or 247 acres) and river estuaries.

Celles-sur-Belle (French pronunciation: [sɛl syʁ bɛl]) is a commune in the Deux-Sèvres department in the Nouvelle-Aquitaine region in western France. It is the site of an abbey dating from the 11th Century which was reconstructed between 1660 and 1685 on the orders of Louis XIV. In January 1973, Celles-sur-Belle absorbed the former communes Montigné and Verrines-sous-Celles. On 1 January 2019, the former commune Saint-Médard was merged into Celles-sur-Belle.

== Population ==
The population data below refer to the commune in its geography as of January 2025.

Historical population
Year	Pop.	±% p.a.
1968	2,794	—
1975	3,007	+1.06%
1982	3,384	+1.70%
1990	3,538	+0.56%
1999	3,592	+0.17%
2007	3,689	+0.33%
2012	3,847	+0.84%
2017	3,907	+0.31%
2023	3,829	−0.34%
Source: INSEE

== See also ==
- Communes of the Deux-Sèvres department
