= Canton of Celles-sur-Belle =

Coordinates: 46.26°N 0.21°W

The canton of Celles-sur-Belle is an administrative division of the Deux-Sèvres department, western France. Its borders were modified at the French canton reorganisation which came into effect in March 2015. Its seat is in Celles-sur-Belle.

It consists of the following communes:

1. Aigondigné
2. Avon
3. Beaussais-Vitré
4. Bougon
5. Celles-sur-Belle
6. Chenay
7. Chey
8. Exoudun
9. Fressines
10. Lezay
11. Messé
12. La Mothe-Saint-Héray
13. Pamproux
14. Prailles-La Couarde
15. Rom
16. Saint-Coutant
17. Sainte-Soline
18. Salles
19. Sepvret
20. Soudan
21. Vançais
22. Vanzay
