= 1691 =

1691 in various calendars
- Gregorian calendar: 1691; MDCXCI
- Ab urbe condita: 2444
- Armenian calendar: 1140; ԹՎ ՌՃԽ
- Assyrian calendar: 6441
- Balinese saka calendar: 1612–1613
- Bengali calendar: 1097–1098
- Berber calendar: 2641
- English Regnal year: 3 Will. & Mar. – 4 Will. & Mar.
- Buddhist calendar: 2235
- Burmese calendar: 1053
- Byzantine calendar: 7199–7200
- Chinese calendar: 庚午年 (Metal Horse); 4388 or 4181 — to — 辛未年 (Metal Goat); 4389 or 4182
- Coptic calendar: 1407–1408
- Discordian calendar: 2857
- Ethiopian calendar: 1683–1684
- Hebrew calendar: 5451–5452
- Hindu calendars
- Vikram Samvat: 1747–1748
- Shaka Samvat: 1612–1613
- Kali Yuga: 4791–4792
- Holocene calendar: 11691
- Igbo calendar: 691–692
- Iranian calendar: 1069–1070
- Islamic calendar: 1102–1103
- Japanese calendar: Genroku 4 (元禄４年)
- Javanese calendar: 1614–1615
- Julian calendar: Gregorian minus 10 days
- Korean calendar: 4024
- Minguo calendar: 221 before ROC 民前221年
- Nanakshahi calendar: 223
- Thai solar calendar: 2233–2234
- Tibetan calendar: ལྕགས་ཕོ་རྟ་ལོ་ (male Iron-Horse); 1817 or 1436 or 664 — to — ལྕགས་མོ་ལུག་ལོ་ (female Iron-Sheep); 1818 or 1437 or 665

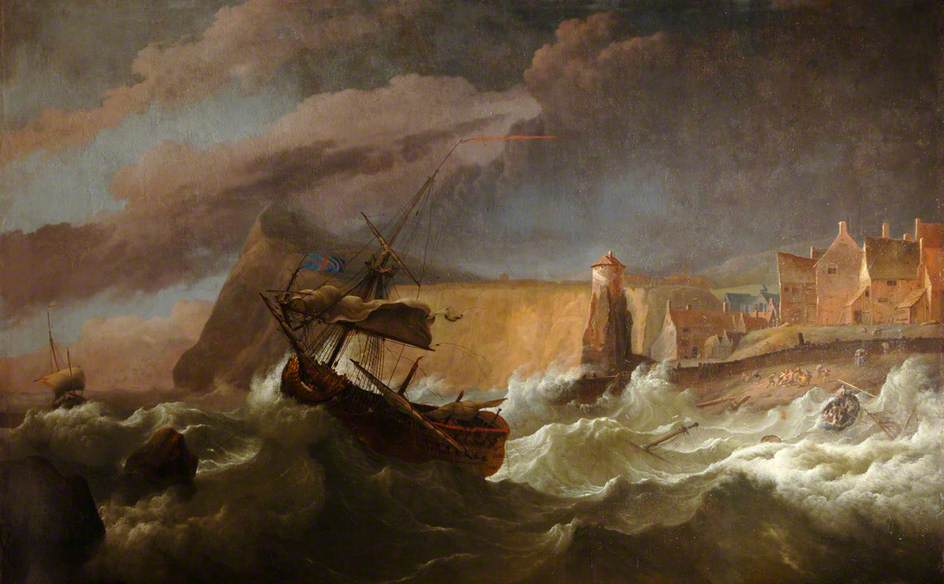
September 3: Sinking of HMS Coronation and HMS Harwich kills 900 Royal Navy personnel at Plymouth Sound.

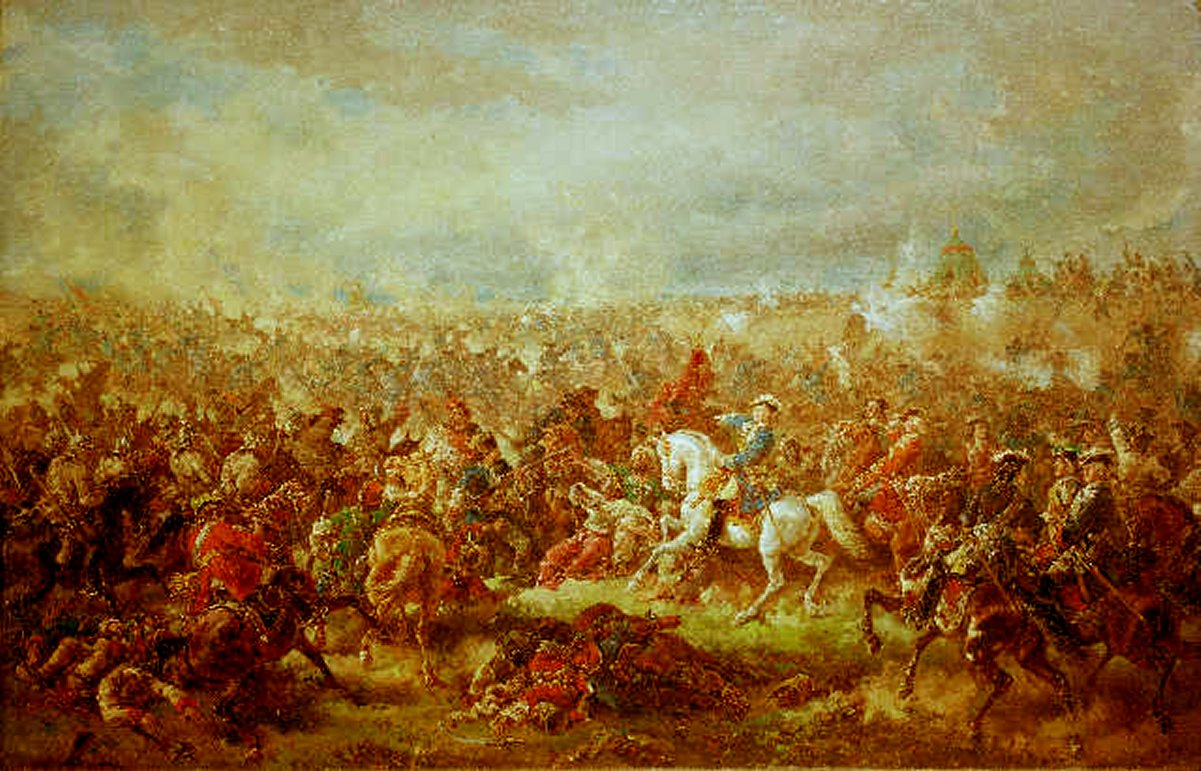
August 12: Holy Roman Empire and allies defeat the Ottoman Empire at the Battle of Slankamen (now in Serbia) and 25,000 Turks are killed.

1691 (MDCXCI) was a common year starting on Monday of the Gregorian calendar and a common year starting on Thursday of the Julian calendar, the 1691st year of the Common Era (CE) and Anno Domini (AD) designations, the 691st year of the 2nd millennium, the 91st year of the 17th century, and the 2nd year of the 1690s decade. As of the start of 1691, the Gregorian calendar was 10 days ahead of the Julian calendar, which remained in localized use until 1923.

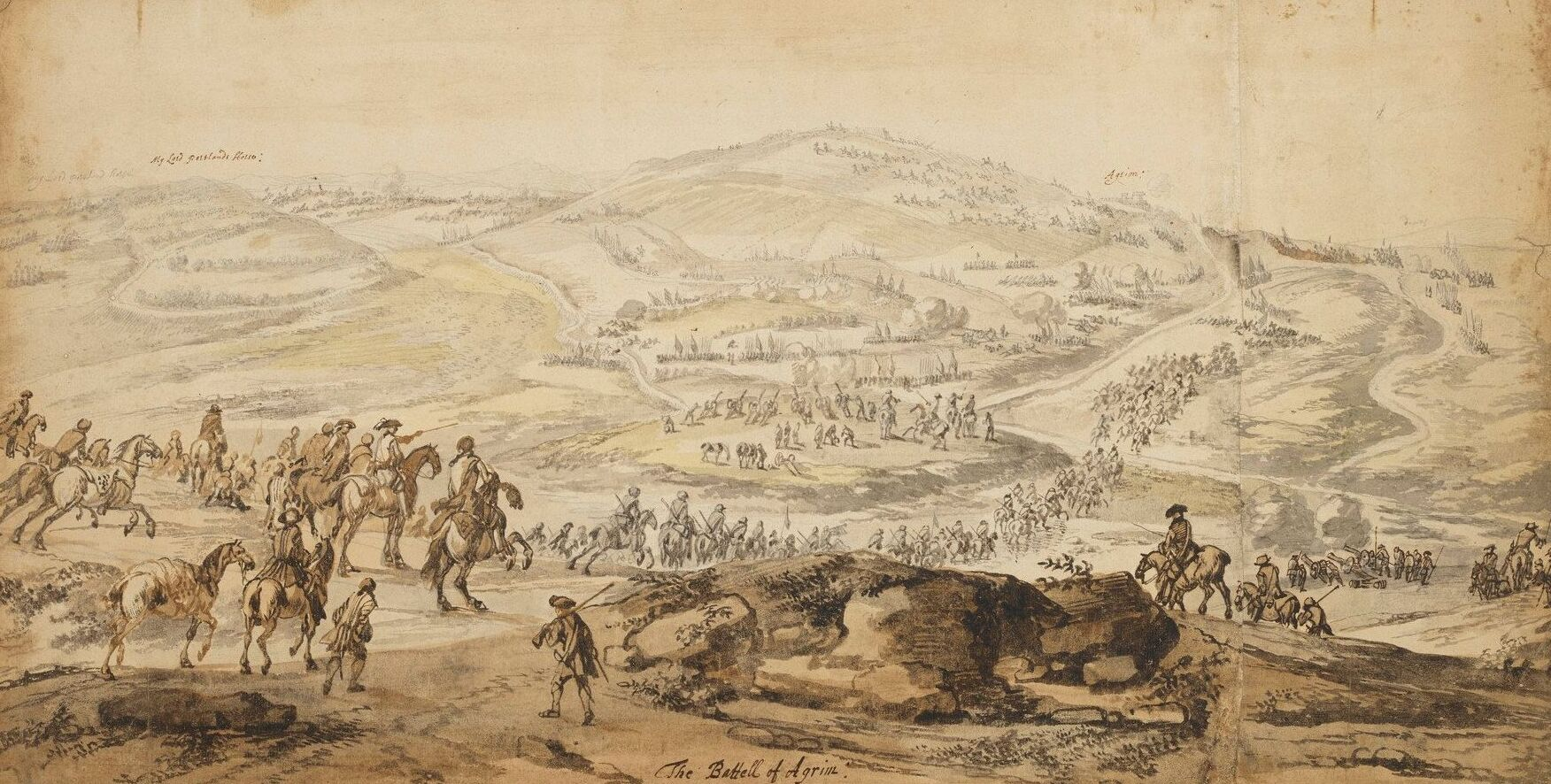
July 12: Army of King William III defeats supporters of former King James II at the Battle of Aughrim.

== Events ==
=== January–March ===
- January 6 – King William III of England, who rules Scotland and Ireland as well as being the Stadtholder of the Dutch Republic, departs from Margate to tend to the affairs of the Netherlands.
- January 14 – A fleet of ships carrying 827 Spanish Navy sailors and marines arrives at Manzanillo Bay on the island of Hispaniola in what is now the Dominican Republic and joins 700 Spanish cavalry, then proceeds westward to invade the French side of the island in what is now Haiti.
- January 15 – King Louis XIV of France issues an order specifically prohibiting play of games of chance, specifically naming basset and similar games, on penalty of 1,000 livres for the first offence.
- January 23 – Spanish colonial administrator Domingo Terán de los Ríos, most recently the governor of Sonora y Sinaloa on the east side of the Gulf of California, is assigned by the Viceroy of New Spain to administer a new province that governs lands on both sides of the Río Bravo del Norte, "Coahuila y Tejas", and effectively becomes the first Governor of Texas.
- February 13 – The Massachusetts Bay Colony issues the first paper money in North America, in lieu of coins, two months after a December 20 law authorizing the printing. The oldest known specimen, for 20 Massachusetts shillings bears the date "Feb. 3, 1690" based on the British old style calendar in use at the time.
- February 28 – An annular solar eclipse is visible across the Philippines, North Borneo and eastern Sumatra.
- March 5 – Nine Years' War: French troops under Marshal Louis-Francois de Boufflers besiege the Spanish-held town of Mons.
- March 14 – The Public Security Police Force of Macau is founded.
- March 17 – The Athenian Mercury begins twice-weekly publication by The Athenian Society in London.
- March 20 – Leisler's Rebellion: A new governor arrives in New York – Jacob Leisler surrenders, after a standoff of several hours.
- March 29 – The Siege of Mons ends in the city's surrender.

=== April–June ===
- April 9 – A fire at the Palace of Whitehall in London destroys its Stone Gallery.
- May 6
  - The Spanish Inquisition condemns and forcibly baptizes 219 Xuetas in Palma, Majorca. When 37 try to escape the island, they are burned alive at the stake.
  - The Province of New York establishes the New York Supreme Court as the Supreme Court of Judicature. It is the oldest Supreme Court with general original jurisdiction.
- May 16 – Jacob Leisler is hanged for treason.
- June – The first performance takes place of the semi-opera King Arthur with a libretto by John Dryden and music by Henry Purcell.
- June 23 – Ahmed II (1691–1695) succeeds Suleiman II (1687–1691), as Ottoman Emperor.

=== July–September ===
- July 12
  - Pope Innocent XII becomes the 242nd pope, succeeding Pope Alexander VIII.
  - Williamite War in Ireland – Battle of Aughrim: Protestant Williamite forces, led by Godert de Ginkell, decisively defeat Jacobites under the Marquis de St Ruth (who is killed).
- August 11 – Battle of La Prairie in Canada: An English and Iroquois force come north from Albany, New York to attack Montreal, but are repulsed with significant casualties by the French and their First Nations allies.
- August 19 – The Battle of Slankamen takes place between the Ottoman Empire and the Holy Roman Empire and allies at Syrmia (now the Serbian province of Vojvodina), and 25,000 Ottomans are killed, including Köprülüzade Fazıl Mustafa Pasha, the Grand Vizier.
- August 23 – A total solar eclipse is visible across South America, Central America and Mexico.
- August 27 – In Scotland, King William offers the Highland clans a pardon for their part in the Jacobite rising of 1689 if they agree to pledge allegiance to him before New Year's Day.
- September 3 – HMS Coronation and HMS Harwich are lost in a storm while making for shelter in Plymouth Sound with 900 killed.
- September 18 – War of the Grand Alliance: English and Dutch forces are defeated by the French in the Battle of Leuze.

=== October–December ===
- October 3 – The Treaty of Limerick, ending the Williamite War in Ireland and guaranteeing civil rights to Roman Catholics, is signed. The Flight of the Wild Geese follows.
- October 17 (October 7 O.S.) – In New England, the two separate colonies of Massachusetts Bay Colony and Plymouth Colony are united into a single entity by an act of the King and Queen of England.
- November 26 – In Limerick, "A Form of Prayer and Thanksgiving to the Almighty God for the Preservation of Their Majesties, the Success of Their Forces in the reducing of Ireland, and for His Majesties Safe Return" is celebrated in all Anglican churches in Britain and Ireland by order of Archbishop Tillotson.
- December 6 – During the Morean War, Captain Luca Dalla Rocca of Naples betrays Venice by surrendering the fortress of Gramvousa, on the island of Crete to the Ottoman Turks, in return for a large amount of money and sanctuary in Istanbul.
- December 22 – Patrick Sarsfield and 19,000 troops of the Irish Army who had been supporters of the Jacobite Rebellion leave the country and relocate to France.

=== Date unknown ===
- HMNB Devonport, currently one of three operating bases in the United Kingdom for the Royal Navy and the largest naval base in Western Europe, opens.
- Michel Rolle invents Rolle's theorem, which states that any real-valued differentiable function that attains equal values at two distinct points must have at least one stationary point somewhere between them.
- The Khalkha submit to the Manchu invaders, bringing most of modern-day Mongolia under the rule of the Qing Dynasty.
- Nimavar school in Isfahan, Iran is built and opens in this era of Suleiman I.
- The textile factory Barnängens manufaktur is founded in Stockholm, Sweden.
- The Society for the Reformation of Manners is founded in the London Borough of Tower Hamlets with the aim of suppressing profanity, immorality, and other lewd activities in general, and of brothels and prostitution in particular.

== Births ==
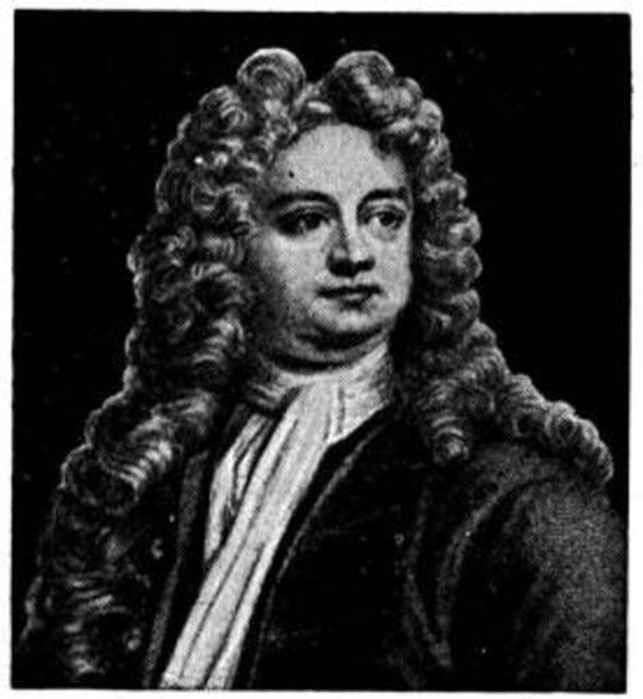
George Lillo born 3 February

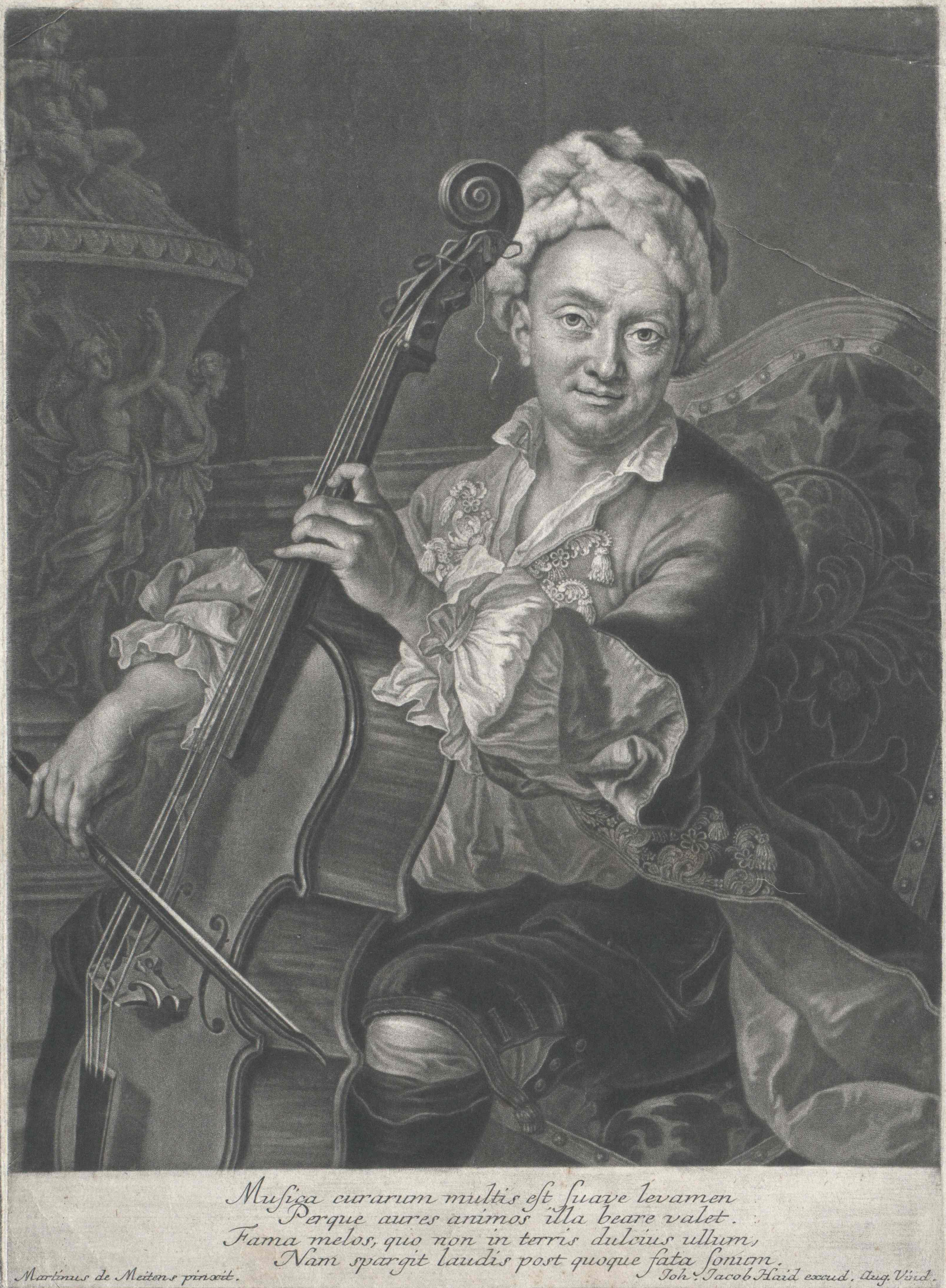
Francesco Alborea born 7 March

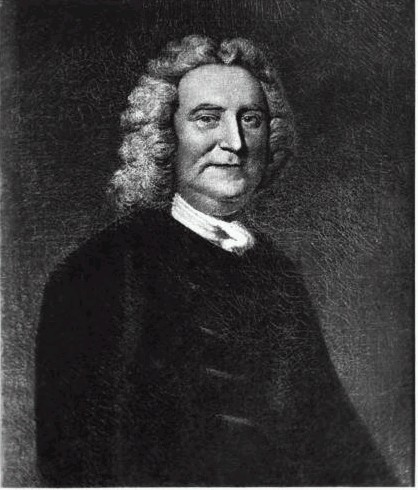
James Alexander (lawyer) born 27 May

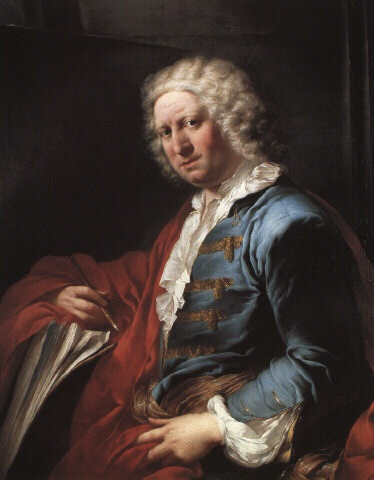
Giovanni Paolo Panini born 17 June

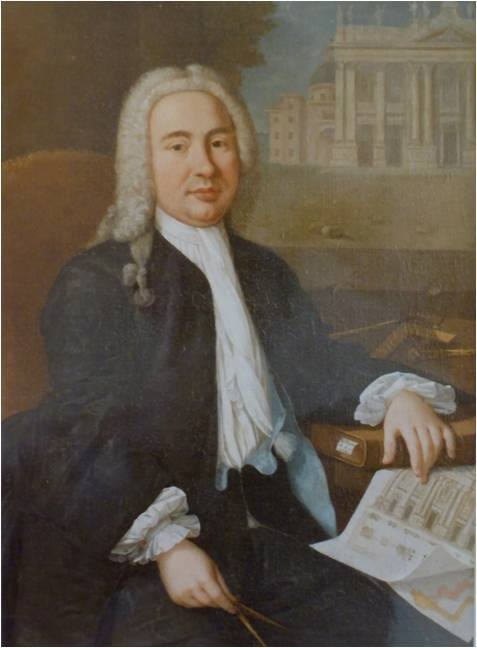
Alessandro Galilei born 25 August

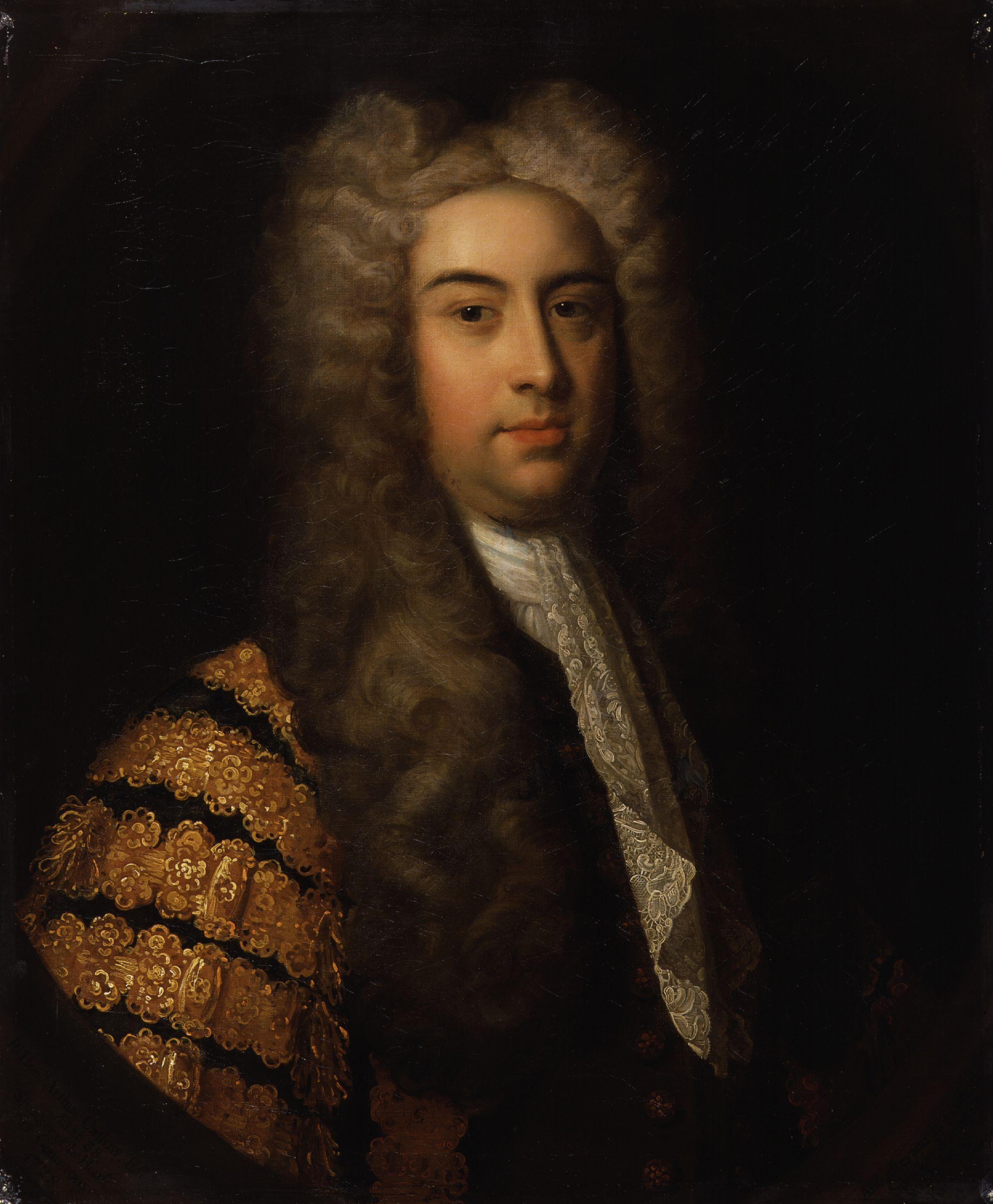
Arthur Onslow born 1 October

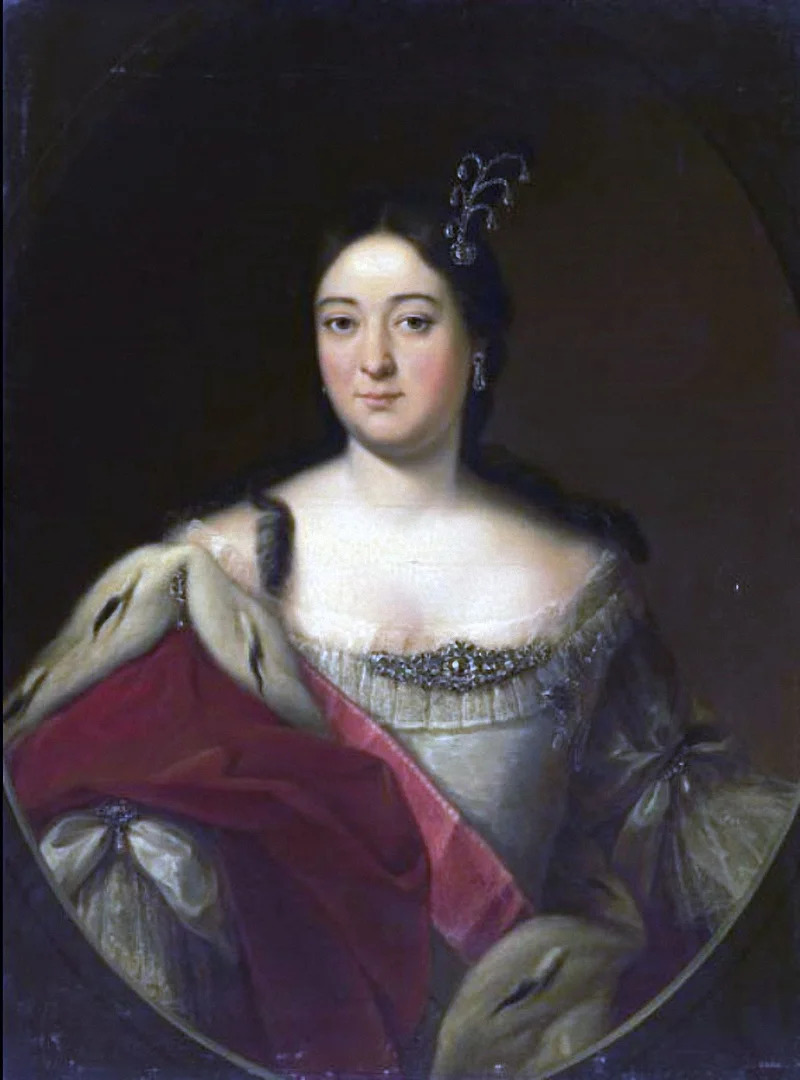
Tsarevna Catherine Ivanovna of Russia born 20 October

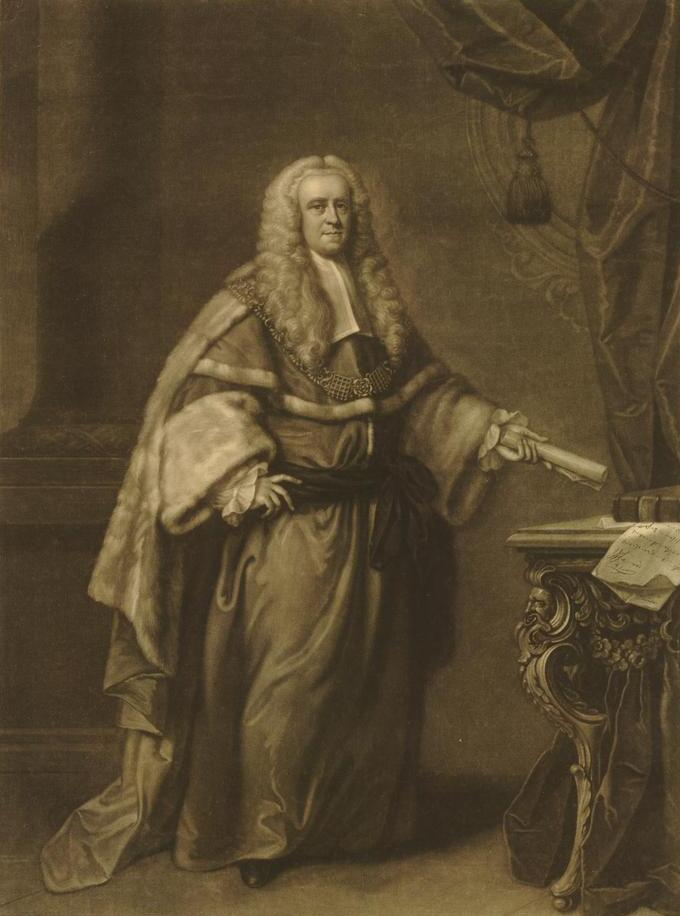
Dudley Ryder (judge) born 4 November

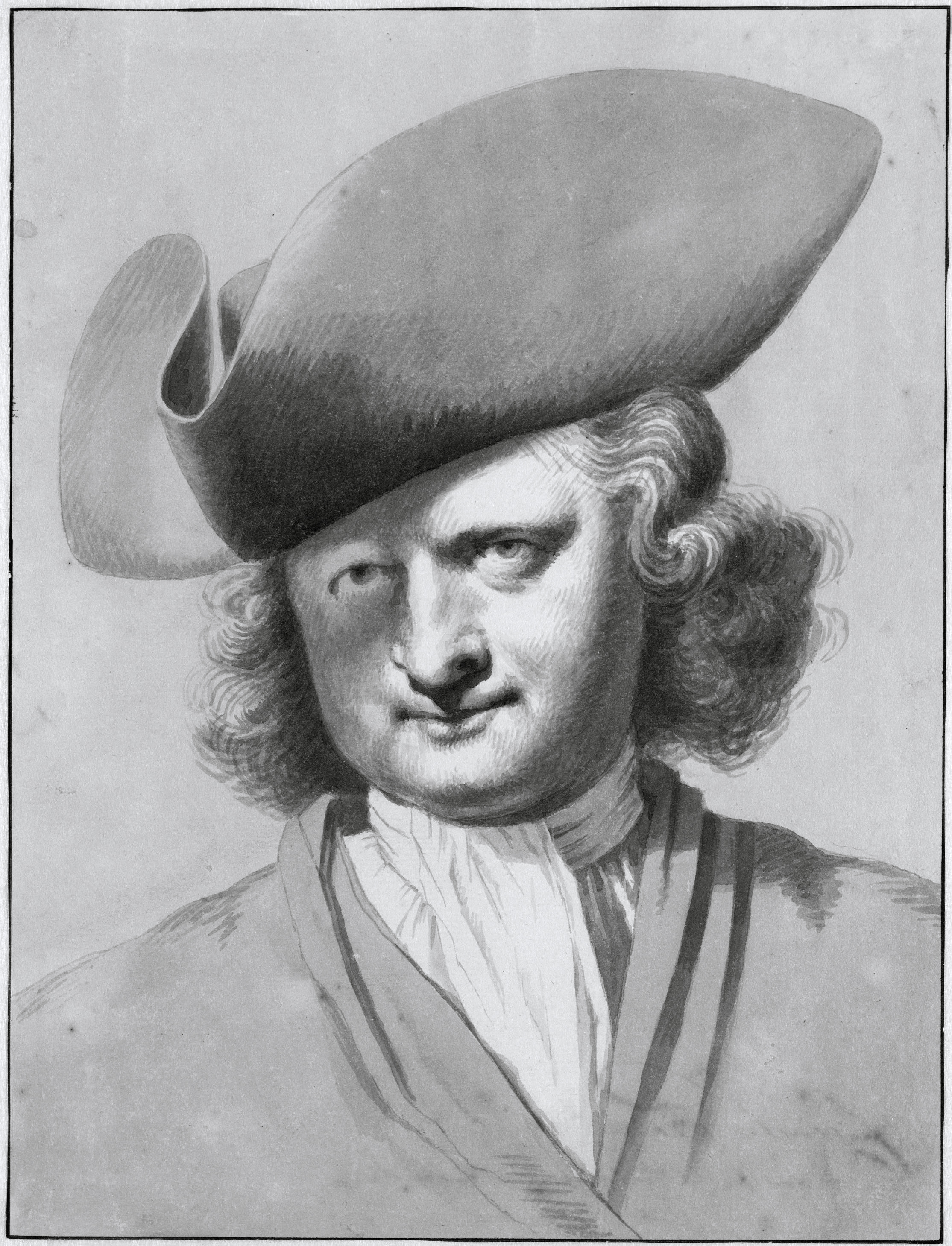
Cornelis Pronk born 10 December

=== January–March ===
- January 8 – George Charles of Hesse-Kassel, Prince of Hesse-Kassel and Prussian general (d. 1755)
- January 16 – Peter Scheemakers, Flemish sculptor (d. 1781)
- January 18 – William Finch, British diplomat (d. 1766)
- January 19 – Reinier Boitet, Delft publisher and writer (d. 1750)
- January 25 – John Folliot, officer of the British Army (d. 1762)
- January 27 – Christian Ulrich II, Duke of Württemberg-Wilhelminenort (d. 1734)
- February 3 – George Lillo, British writer (d. 1739)
- February 4 – Louis-Basile de Bernage, French jurist (d. 1767)
- February 6 – Francisco Cajigal de la Vega, Spanish general and Viceroy (d. 1777)
- February 8 – John Adams Sr., British colonial farmer, minister, father of the U.S. president, John Adams (d. 1761)
- February 10 – Samuel Wesley, English poet and cleric (d. 1739)
- February 17 – Julius Valentyn Stein van Gollenesse, Governor of Zeylan (d. 1755)
- February 27 – Edward Cave, English editor and publisher (d. 1754)
- March 1 – Conrad Beissel, German-American religious leader (d. 1768)
- March 4 – Pierre-Herman Dosquet, Catholic bishop (d. 1777)
- March 7 – Francesco Alborea, Italian composer and cellist (d. 1739)
- March 12 – Dionisia de Santa María Mitas Talangpaz, Filipino saint (d. 1732)
- March 16 – Michel Baudouin, Canadian missionary (d. 1768)
- March 20 – Princess Dorothea Wilhelmine of Saxe-Zeitz, Landgravine of Hesse-Kassel (d. 1743)
- March 22 – Philipp von Stosch, Prussian antiquarian (d. 1757)
- March 28 – Charles Emil Lewenhaupt, Swedish general (d. 1743)
- March 30 – Charles Hamilton, Count of Arran, English collector of manuscripts (d. 1754)
- March 31 – Franz Hunolt, German preacher (d. 1746)

=== April–June ===
- April 2 – Christian Ernest of Stolberg-Wernigerode, Count (d. 1771)
- April 5
  - Franz Joseph Spiegler, German painter (d. 1757)
  - Louis VIII, Landgrave of Hesse-Darmstadt (d. 1768)
- April 6 – Johann Heinrich Zopf, German historian (d. 1774)
- April 8 – John Bampfylde, British politician (d. 1750)
- April 9
  - Paul Egell, German sculptor and plasterer (d. 1752)
  - Johann Matthias Gesner, German classical scholar and schoolmaster (d. 1761)
- April 13
  - Joseph-Charles Roettiers, French engraver and medallist (d. 1779)
  - Johann Friedrich Weidler, German astronomer and mathematician (d. 1755)
- April 23 – René Hérault, French police chief (d. 1740)
- April 30 – Henry Ingram, 7th Viscount of Irvine, Scottish peer and politician (d. 1761)
- May 1 – Kasimir Wedig von Bonin, German military personnel (d. 1752)
- May 23 – Giuseppe Orsoni, Italian artist, 1691–1755 (d. 1755)
- May 25 – Infante Francisco, Duke of Beja, Portuguese prince of the second House of Braganza (d. 1742)
- May 27 – James Alexander, American lawyer in colonial New York (d. 1756)
- June 2 – Nicolau Nasoni, Italian architect (d. 1773)
- June 4 – Daniel Horsmanden, American judge (d. 1778)
- June 8 – James Cecil, 5th Earl of Salisbury, English Earl (d. 1728)
- June 14 – Jan Francisci, Slovak organist and composer (d. 1758)
- June 17
  - George August, Count of Erbach-Schönberg, German noble (d. 1758)
  - Giovanni Paolo Panini, Italian painter and architect (d. 1765)
- June 20 – Pietro Antonio Magatti, Italian painter (d. 1767)
- June 23 – John Thomas, English bishop of Lincoln and bishop of Salisbury (d. 1766)

=== July–September ===
- July 17 – Peder von Todderud, Danish autobiographer (d. 1772)
- July 24 – Harry Powlett, 4th Duke of Bolton, British politician (d. 1759)
- July 26 – Sir John Trelawny, 4th Baronet, British politician (d. 1756)
- July 31 – Bartolomé Rull, Spanish bishop (d. 1769)
- August 5 – Charles d'Orléans de Rothelin, French priest and scholar (d. 1744)
- August 8 – Christina Beata Dagström, Swedish baroness and glass works owner (d. 1754)
- August 21 – Anne Coventry, Countess of Coventry, English plaintiff in a marriage settlement case (d. 1788)
- August 25 – Alessandro Galilei, Italian architect, mathematician (d. 1737)
- August 28 – Elisabeth Christine of Brunswick-Wolfenbüttel, Holy Roman Empress consort (d. 1750)
- August 29 – Richard Challoner, English Catholic prelate (d. 1781)
- August 30 – Louis-Jean Lévesque de Pouilly, French philosopher (d. 1750)
- September 1 – James Burrough, English academic and architect (d. 1764)
- September 3
  - Ana Maria de Lorena, 1st Duchess of Abrantes, Portuguese noblewoman (d. 1761)
  - Armande Félice de La Porte Mazarin, French noblewoman, courtier and duelist (d. 1729)
  - Antoine-Alexis Perier de Salvert, French naval officer (d. 1757)
- September 20 – Giovanni Francesco Crivelli, Italian mathematician and priest (d. 1743)
- September 22 – Louis-Philippe de Rigaud, Marquis of Vaudreuil, French Navy officer (d. 1763)

=== October–December ===
- October 1 – Arthur Onslow, Speaker of the British House of Commons (d. 1768)
- October 6 – Sir Edward Turner, 1st Baronet, British Baronet (d. 1735)
- October 11 – John Leland, English Presbyterian minister (d. 1766)
- October 14 – John Lovewell, Nashua, New Hampshire hero (d. 1725)
- October 18 – Kaspar Ernst von Schultze, German military personnel (d. 1757)
- October 20 – Tsarevna Catherine Ivanovna of Russia, Tsarevna of Russia (d. 1733)
- October 27 – Jacob Severin, Dano-Norwegian merchant (d. 1753)
- November 4
  - William Bulkeley, sheriff and diarist from Anglesey (d. 1760)
  - Dudley Ryder, British politician and judge (d. 1756)
- November 9 – Antonio Francesco Gori, Italian antiquarian (d. 1757)
- November 10 – Wilhelm Heinrich, Duke of Saxe-Eisenach, German duke (d. 1741)
- November 11 – Peregrine Osborne, 3rd Duke of Leeds, British peer (d. 1731)
- November 14
  - James Lindsay, 5th Earl of Balcarres, Governor of Jamaica (d. 1768)
  - Henry Shirley, 3rd Earl Ferrers, British peer (d. 1745)
- November 18 – Mårten Triewald, merchant and technician, one of the founders of the Royal Swedish Academy of Sciences (d. 1747)
- November 19 – William Fraser, of Fraserfield, politician (d. 1727)
- November 21 – Domingo José Claros Pérez de Guzmán, 13th Duke of Medina Sidonia, noble (d. 1739)
- November 27 – Josef Antonín Plánický, Czech composer, choirmaster and singer (d. 1732)
- December 10 – Cornelis Pronk, Dutch painter (d. 1759)
- December 18 – Gaston-Laurent Coeurdoux, French Indianist and missionary (d. 1779)
- December 30 – Conrad Friedrich Hurlebusch, German Dutch composer and organist (d. 1765)

== Deaths ==
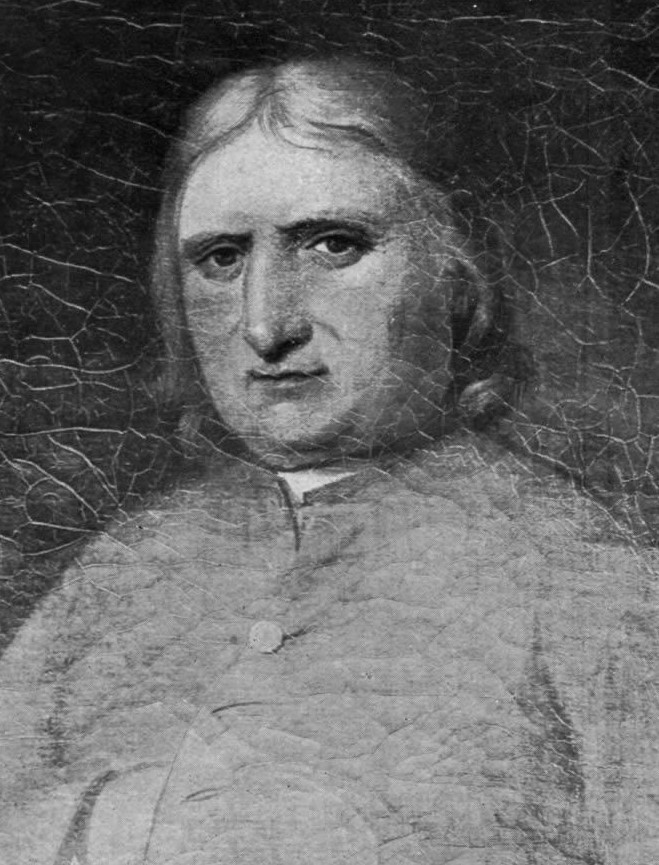
George Fox died 13 January

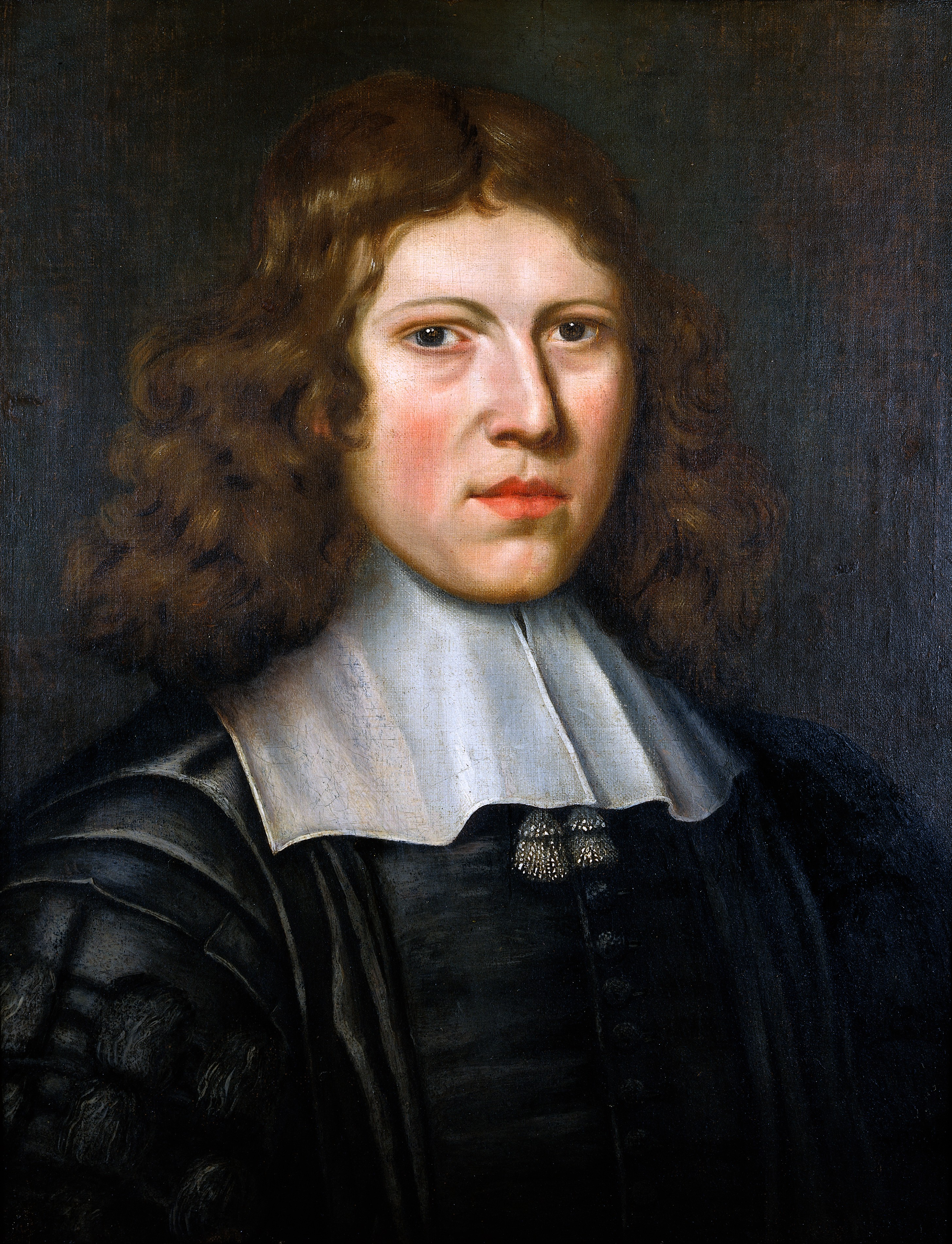
Richard Lower (physician) died 17 January

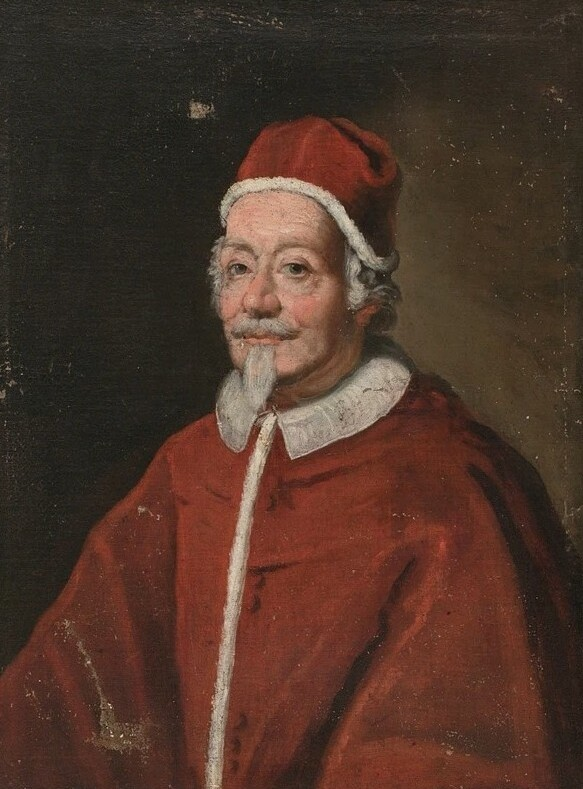
Pope Alexander VIII died 1 February

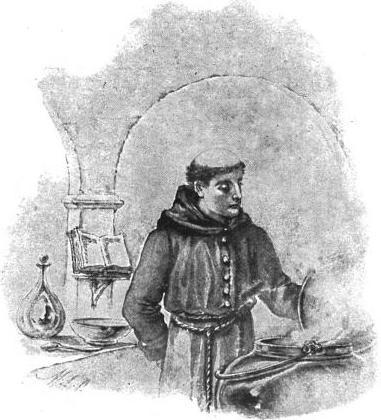
Brother Lawrence died 12 February

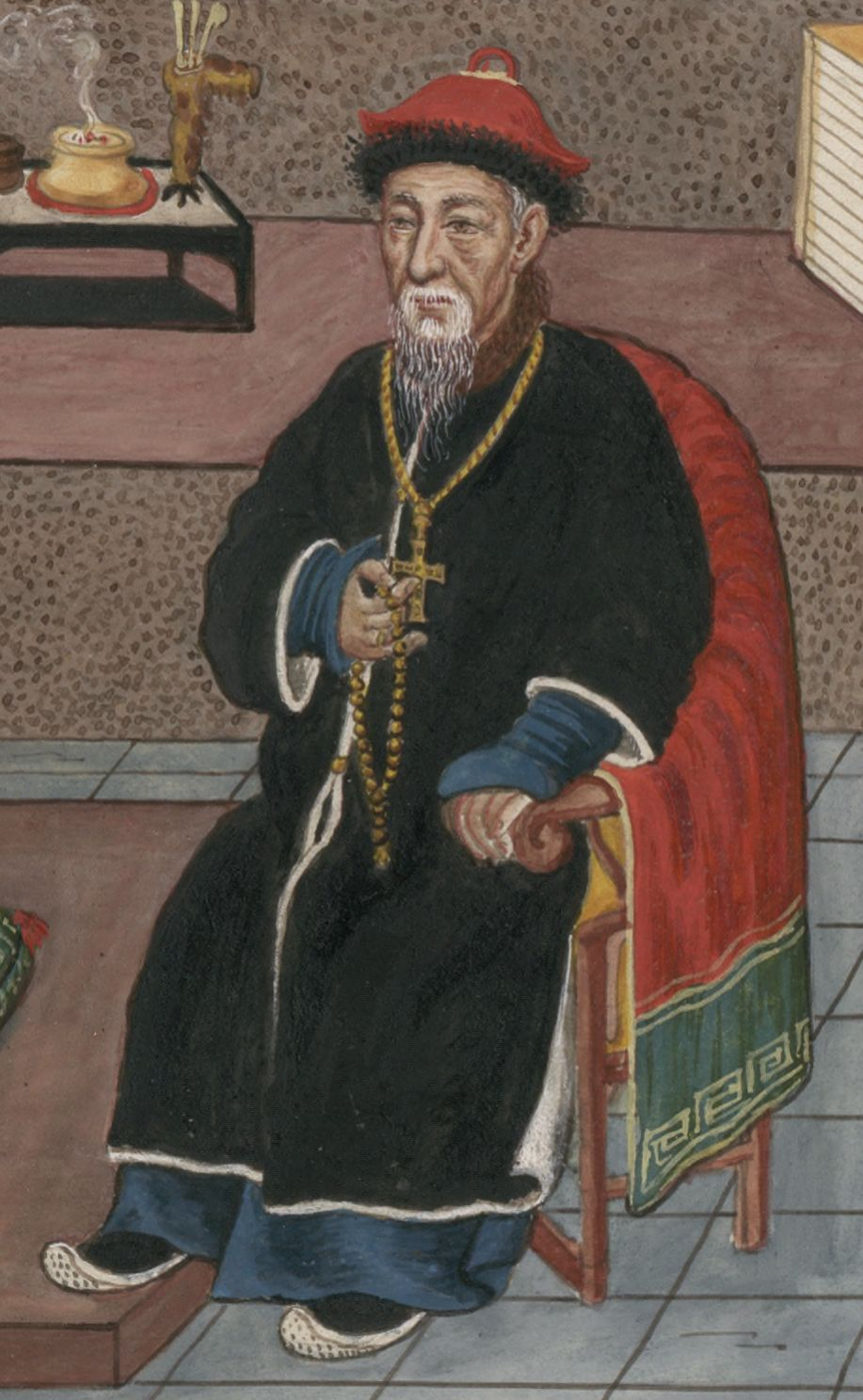
Luo Wenzao died 27 February

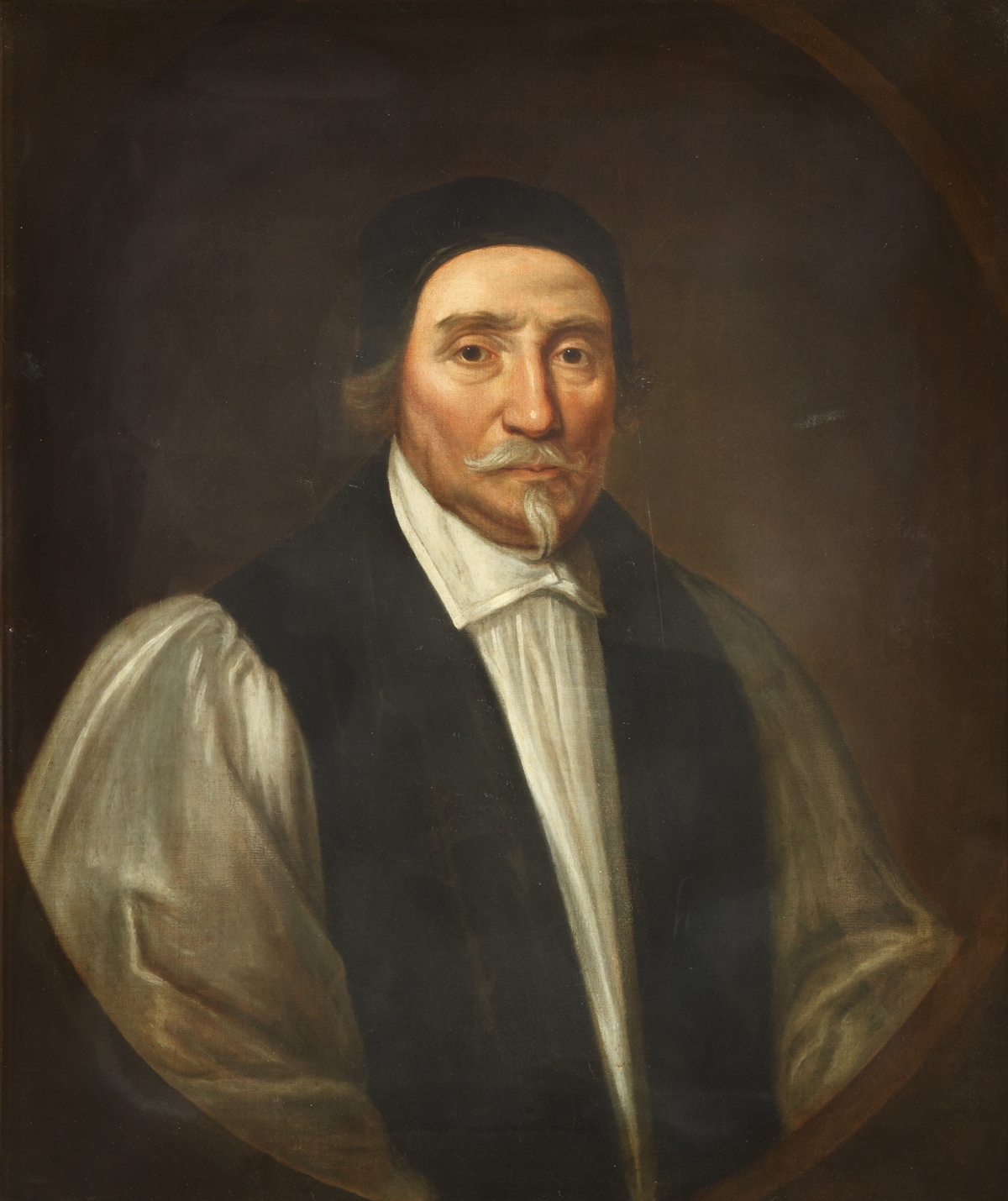
Thomas Lamplugh died 5 May

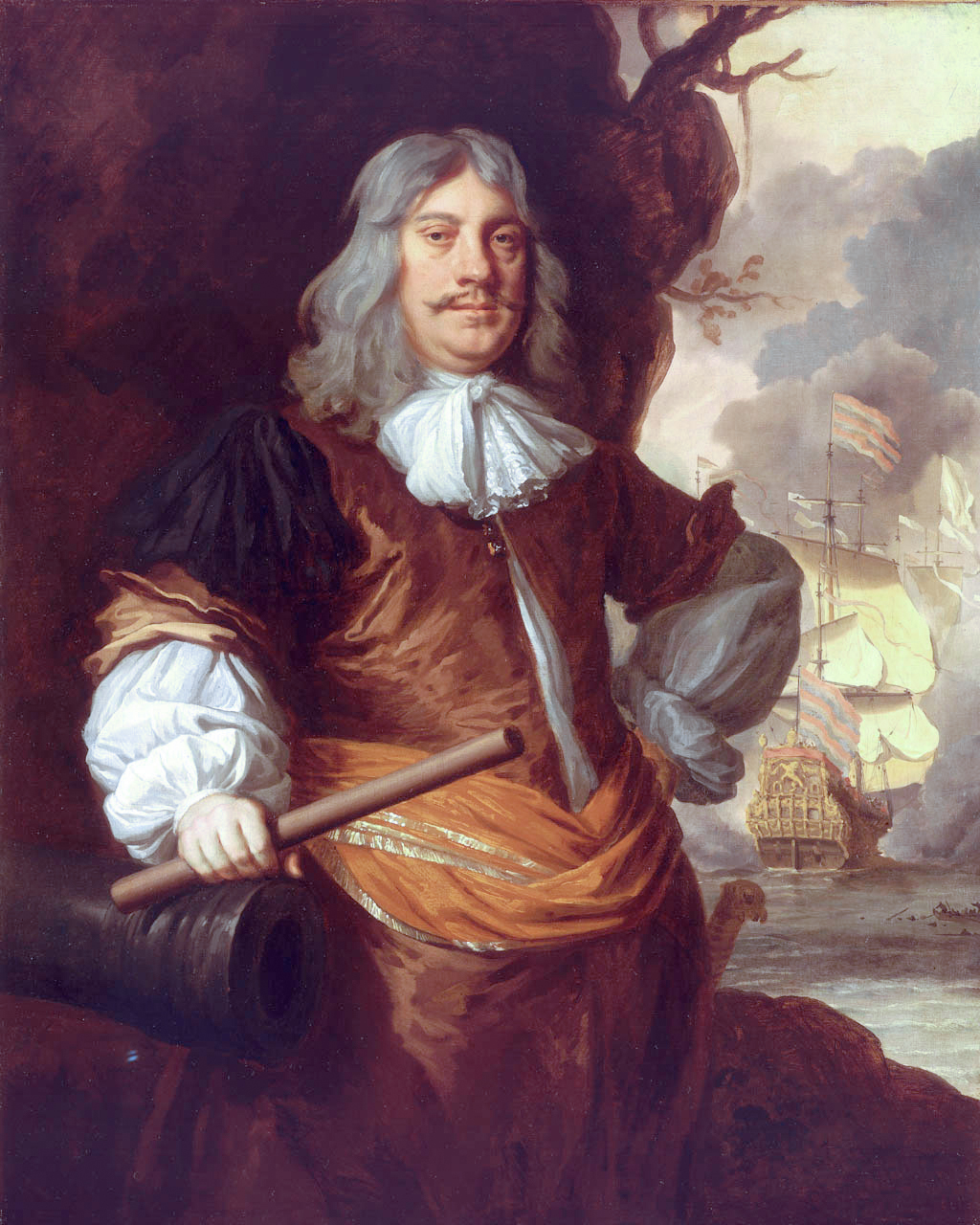
Cornelis Tromp died 29 May

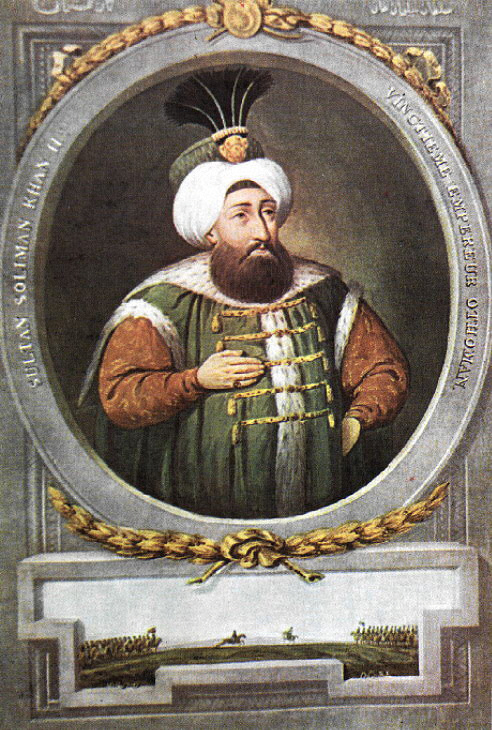
Suleiman II of the Ottoman Empire died 22 June

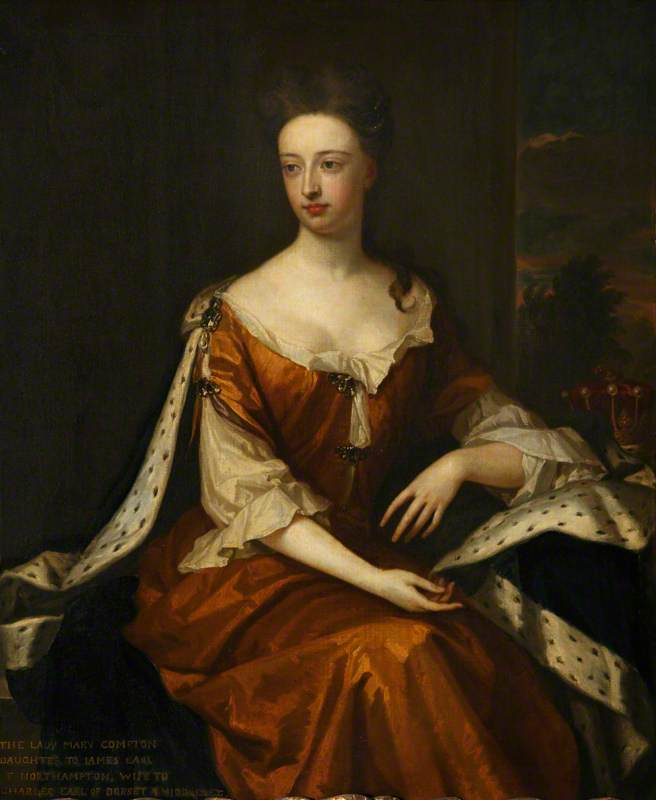
Mary Sackville died 6 August

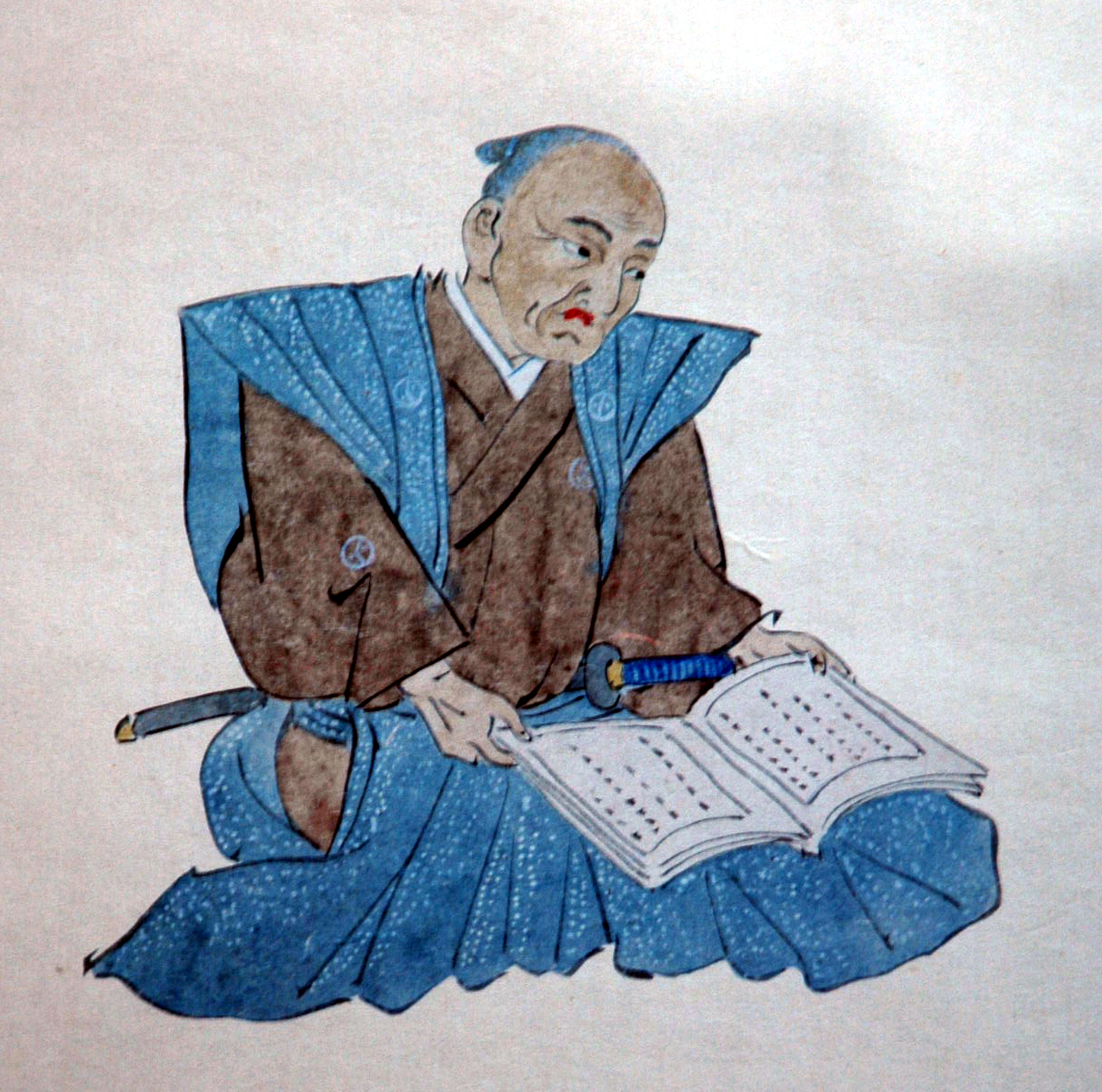
Kumazawa Banzan died 9 September

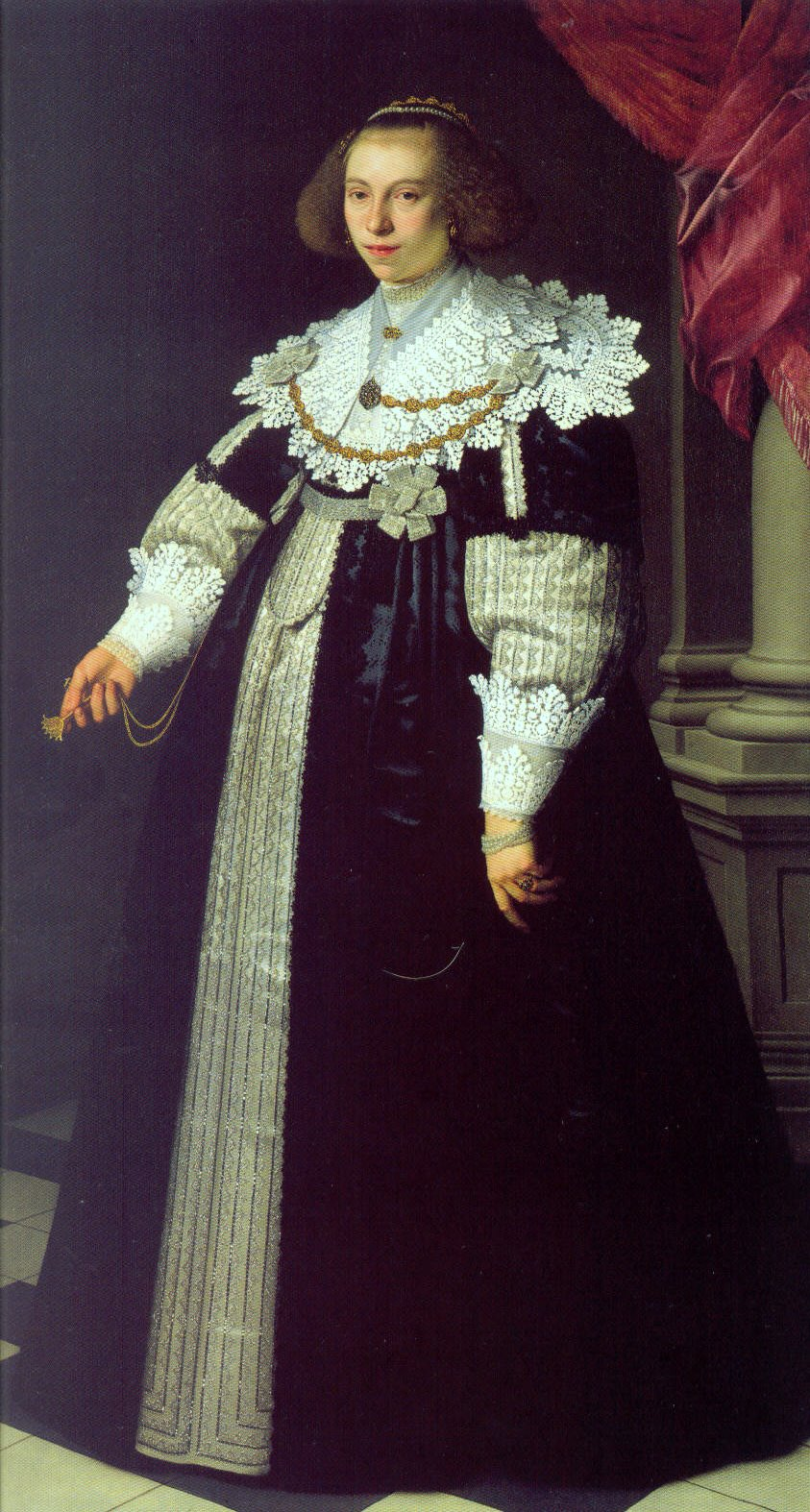
Catharina Hooft died 30 September

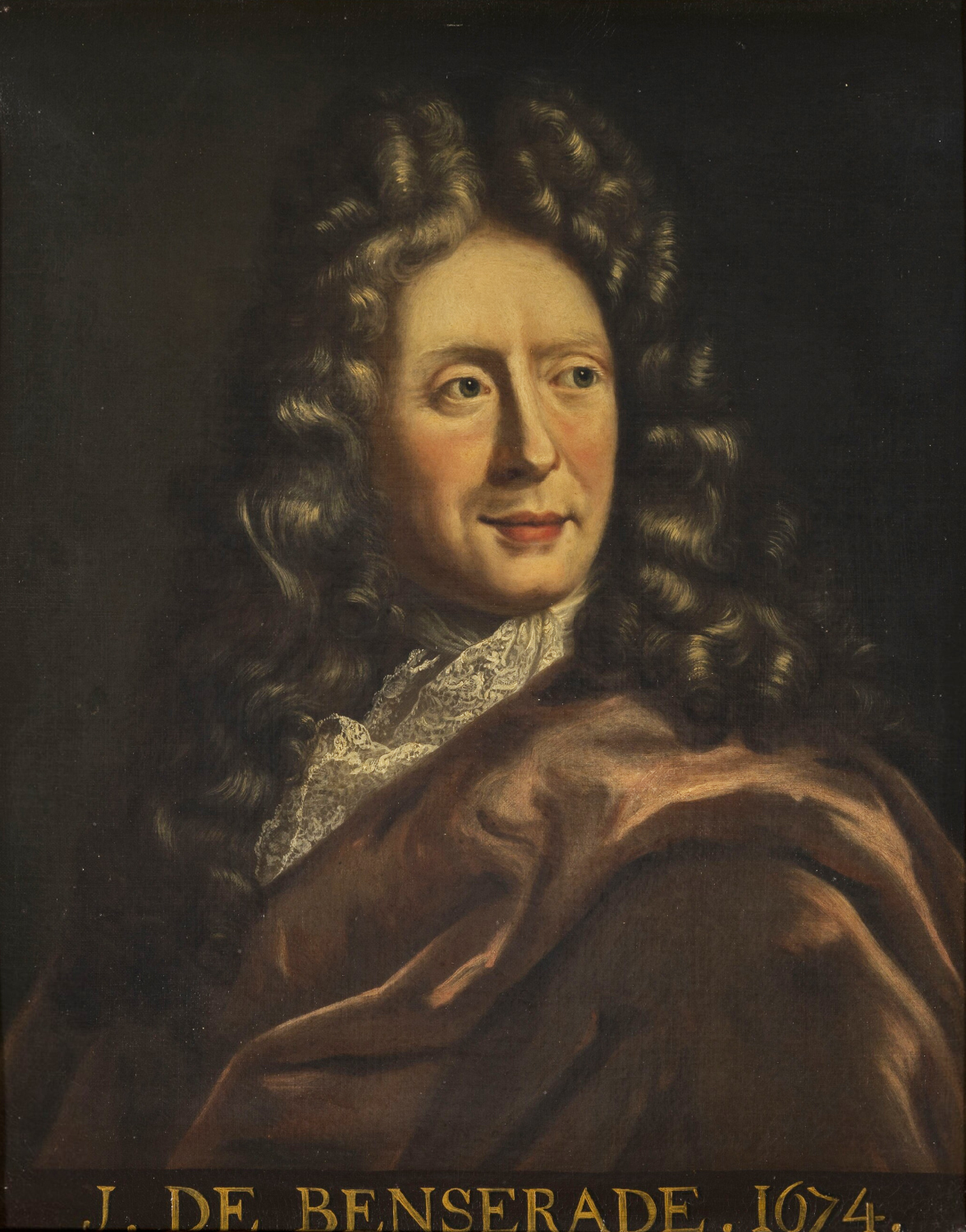
Isaac de Benserade died 10 October

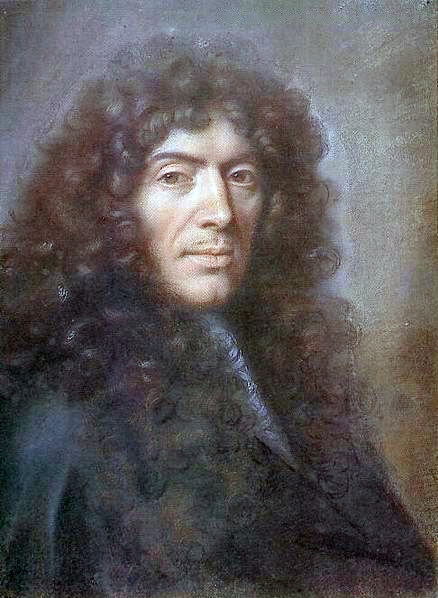
Israel Silvestre died 11 October

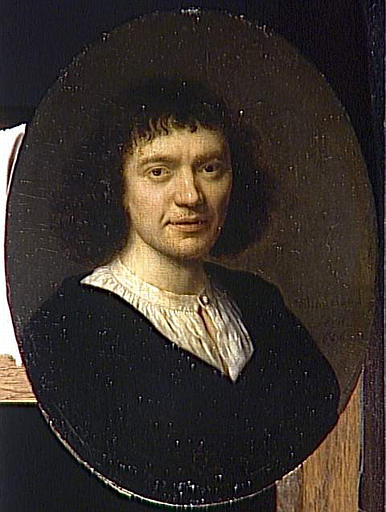
Pieter Cornelisz van Slingelandt died 7 November

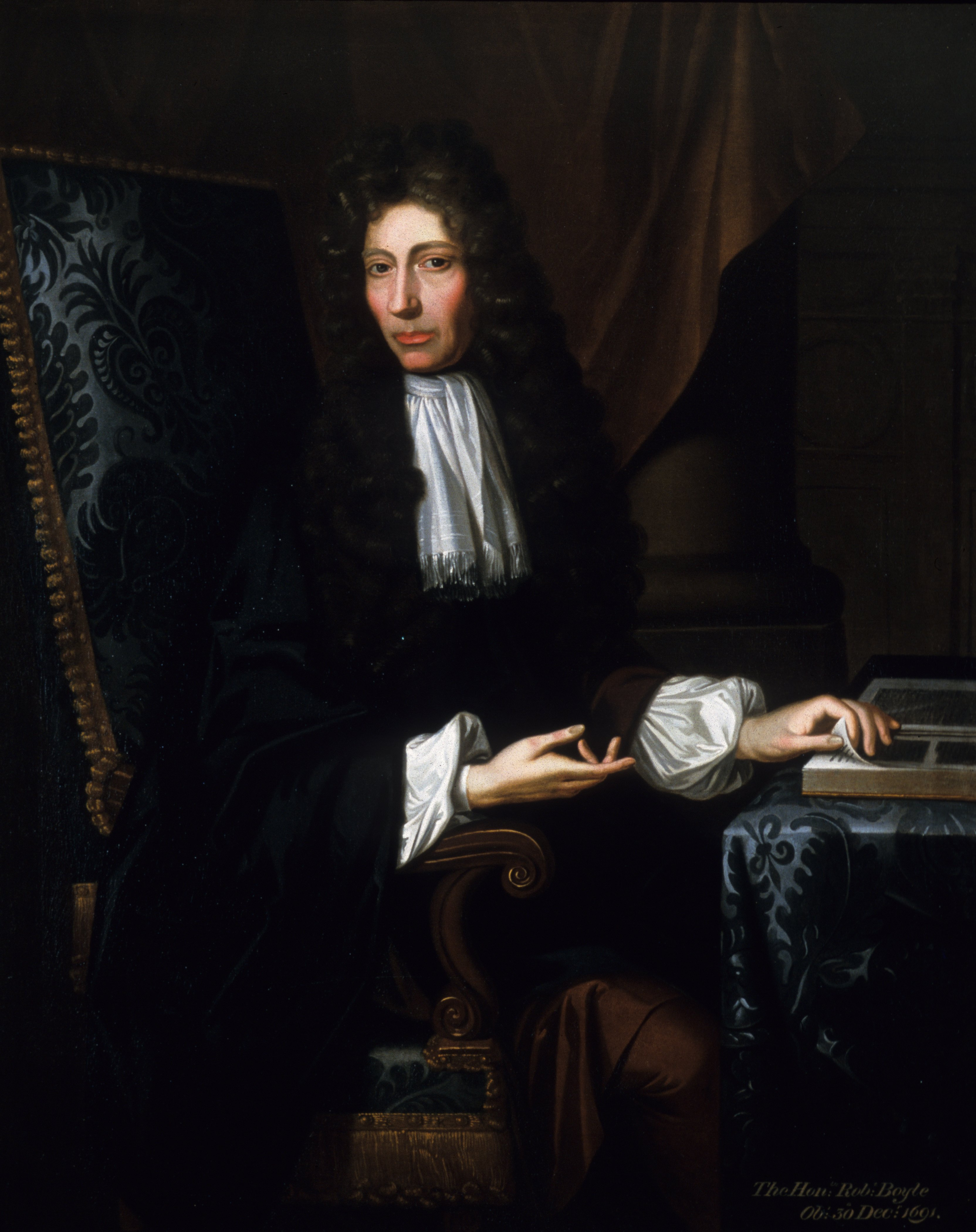
Robert Boyle died 31 December

=== January–March ===
- January 10 – Wolf Caspar von Klengel, German builder, architect and officer (b. 1630)
- January 13 – George Fox, English founder of the Society of Friends (b. 1624)
- January 17 – Richard Lower, English physician (b. 1631)
- January 19 – Giacinto Brandi, Italian painter (b. 1621)
- January 22 – Edward Master, English politician (b. 1610)
- January 23 – William Maurice, Prince of Nassau-Siegen (b. 1649)
- January 24 – James Bishop, English-born 23rd Deputy Governor of Connecticut (b. 1625)
- January 25 – Anthonie Hals, painter from the Northern Netherlands (b. 1621)
- January 28 – John Ashton, English courtier and Jacobite conspirator (b. 1653)
- January 29 – Asai Ryōi, Buddhist priest and writer (b. 1612)
- February 1 – Pope Alexander VIII, pope of the Catholic Church from 1689 to 1691 (b. 1610)
- February 4 – Paul Amman, German botanist and physician (b. 1634)
- February 7 – Nguyễn Phúc Trăn, Vietnamese ruler (b. 1650)
- February 8 – Carlo Rainaldi, Italian architect (b. 1611)
- February 12 – Brother Lawrence, French Christian monk (b. 1614)
- February 19 – Sir Thomas Lee, 1st Baronet, English politician (b. 1635)
- February 20 – Juan Francisco de la Cerda, 8th Duke of Medinaceli, Spanish politician (b. 1637)
- February 21
  - Hans Willem van Aylva, Dutch soldier (b. 1633)
  - Antonio Bichi, Catholic cardinal (b. 1614)
- February 22 – Juan del Vado, Spanish composer (b. 1625)
- February 25 – Antonio de Benavides y Bazán, Roman Catholic patriarch (b. 1610)
- February 27 – Luo Wenzao, First Chinese bishop (b. 1615)
- February 28
  - Joseph Moxon, British hydrographer (b. 1627)
  - Mathias Spieler, Swedish architect (b. 1640)
- March 1 – Sultan Bahu, Punjabi Sufi mystic, poet and scholar (b. 1630)
- March 5 – Jean-Jacques Renouard de Villayer, French postal pioneer (b. 1607)
- March 8 – Gabriel Souart, Canadian priest (b. 1611)
- March 11 – Giulio Spinola, Italian cardinal (b. 1612)
- March 15 – Anna Salome of Manderscheid-Blankenheim, Abbess of Thorn Abbey, later abbess of Essen Abbey (b. 1628)
- March 17 – Thomas Wynne, English personal physician of William Penn (b. 1627)
- March 19 – Nicholas De Mayer, Dutch politician (b. 1635)
- March 29 – Nicolas Talon, French Jesuit (b. 1605)

=== April–June ===
- April 3
  - Antoine Philibert Albert Bailly, Italian bishop of Aosta (b. 1605)
  - Jean Petitot, Swiss enamel painter (b. 1607)
- April 6 – Peyton Ventris, English politician (b. 1645)
- April 13 – Melchor de Navarra, Duke of Palata, Spanish military personnel (b. 1626)
- April 15 – Joachim Feller, German academic (b. 1638)
- April 20 – Raimondo Capizucchi, Italian cardinal (b. 1616)
- April 21
  - Henry Herbert, 4th Baron Herbert of Chirbury, English peer (b. 1640)
  - George Howard, 4th Earl of Suffolk, British Earl (b. 1625)
  - Ralph Knight, English soldier and politician (b. 1610)
- April 23 – Jean-Henri d'Anglebert, French harpsichordist and composer (b. 1629)
- April 27 – Lorenzo Crasso, Italian literary studies scholar and advocate (b. 1623)
- April 30 – Kirill Naryshkin, maternal grandfather of Peter the Great (b. 1623)
- May 5 – Thomas Lamplugh, Archbishop of York, Bishop of Exeter, Dean of Rochester (b. 1615)
- May 6 – Caterina Tarongí, Mallorcan Jewess burned alive by the Inquisition (b. 1646)
- May 10 – John Birch, British politician (b. 1615)
- May 13 – William Faithorne, English artist and engraver (b. 1616)
- May 16
  - John Alford, English politician (b. 1645)
  - Jacob Leisler, Leader of the Leisler Rebellion, de facto governor of New York (b. 1640)
  - Jacob Milborne, American clerk living in the Province of New York who was an ally (b. 1648)
- May 18 – Sir William Talbot, 3rd Baronet, Irish judge and baronet (b. 1640)
- May 23 – Adrien Auzout, French astronomer (b. 1622)
- May 27 – Pierre Allemand, Canadian ships pilot, explorer, and fur-trader (b. 1662)
- May 29 – Cornelis Tromp, Dutch admiral (b. 1629)
- June 7 – William Jephson, English Member of Parliament (b. 1640)
- June 9
  - Lavater brothers, Swiss physician (b. 1611)
  - Charles Maitland, 3rd Earl of Lauderdale, Scottish judge (b. 1620)
- June 15 – Henry Pollexfen, English politician (b. 1632)
- June 22 – Suleiman II of the Ottoman Empire, Sultan of the Ottoman Empire from 1687 to 1691 (b. 1642)
- June 23 – Sir William Gardiner, 1st Baronet, Member of the Parliament of England (b. 1628)
- June 26
  - Anne Chamberlyne, English sailor (b. 1667)
  - John Flavel, English Presbyterian clergyman (b. 1627)

=== July–September ===
- July 3 – Marc'Antonio Pasqualini, Italian opera singer and composer (b. 1614)
- July 10 – Giacinto Platania, Italian painter (b. 1612)
- July 12
  - John Hamilton, Irish military officer of Scottish descent (b. 1650)
  - Marquis de St Ruth, French (killed at the Battle of Aughrim) (b. 1650)
  - Charles Chalmot de Saint-Ruhe, French general (b. 1650)
- July 16 – François-Michel le Tellier, Marquis de Louvois, Secretary of State for War under Louis XIV (b. 1641)
- July 18 – Sir John Bowyer, 2nd Baronet, English politician (b. 1653)
- July 20 – Jacques Frémin, French missionary (b. 1626)
- July 23 – Paul Barillon, French diplomat (b. 1630)
- July 26 – Henry Cavendish, 2nd Duke of Newcastle, English politician (b. 1630)
- July 30 – Daniel Georg Morhof, German writer and scholar (b. 1639)
- August 1 – Marie de Hautefort, French noble (b. 1616)
- August 2 – Frederick I, Duke of Saxe-Gotha-Altenburg (b. 1646)
- August 6
  - João Ferreira de Almeida, pastor (b. 1628)
  - Mary Sackville, Countess of Dorset, English countess (b. 1669)
- August 7
  - Livio Mehus, Flemish painter, draughtsman and engraver (b. 1630)
  - Philip Skippon, English politician and naturalist (b. 1641)
- August 8 – François Verwilt, Dutch Golden Age painter (b. 1620)
- August 11 – Nicolaes van Verendael, Flemish painter (b. 1640)
- August 14 – Richard Talbot, 1st Earl of Tyrconnel, Irish rebel (b. 1630)
- August 18 – François d'Alesso d'Éragny, French soldier, governor general of the French Antilles (b. 1643)
- August 19
  - Köprülüzade Fazıl Mustafa Pasha, Ottoman Grand Vizier (b. 1637)
  - Adam Zrinski, Croatian count and military officer (b. 1662)
- August 22 – Sir Ralph Delaval, 1st Baronet, English landowner and politician (b. 1622)
- August 25 – Philippe Charles d'Arenberg, Duke of Arenberg (b. 1663)
- August 27 – Sir Thomas Norton, 1st Baronet, Member of the Parliament of England (b. 1615)
- September 6 – William Pulteney, Member of Parliament (b. 1624)
- September 9 – Kumazawa Banzan, Japanese philosopher (b. 1619)
- September 10 – Edward Pococke, English orientalist and biblical scholar (b. 1604)
- September 12 – John George III, Elector of Saxony from 1680 to 1691 (b. 1647)
- September 14 – William Hussey, English ambassador to the Ottoman Empire (b. 1642)
- September 15 – Adam Loftus, 1st Viscount Lisburne, Irish noble (b. 1647)
- September 18
  - Charles Fane, 3rd Earl of Westmorland, Member of Parliament and House of Lords (b. 1635)
  - Giovanni Francesco Ginetti, nephew of Cardinal Marzio Ginetti (b. 1626)
- September 19 – Sir Henry Piers, 1st Baronet, Anglo-Irish landowner, soldier, Member of Parliament, Sheriff and antiquarian (b. 1629)
- September 28 – Johannes Fatio, Swiss surgeon (b. 1649)
- September 29 – Johannes Wolfgang von Bodman, Roman Catholic bishop (b. 1651)
- September 30 – Catharina Hooft, wife of Cornelis de Graeff (b. 1618)

=== October–December ===
- October 4
  - Louis Abelly, Catholic bishop (b. 1604)
  - Federico Baldeschi Colonna, Italian Catholic Cardinal (b. 1625)
  - Francisco de Figueroa, Roman Catholic prelate, Bishop of Tropea (b. 1634)
- October 5 – Paul Mignard, French painter and printmaker (b. 1639)
- October 8 – Thomas Barlow, English academic and clergyman, Provost of The Queen's College, Oxford and Bishop of Lincoln (b. 1607)
- October 9 – William Sacheverell, English politician (b. 1638)
- October 10
  - Isaac de Benserade, French writer (b. 1613)
  - Nicholas Gassaway, Colonel, Maryland Provincial Forces (b. 1634)
- October 11 – Israel Silvestre, French topographical etcher (b. 1621)
- October 18 – Christian I, Duke of Saxe-Merseburg, German noble (b. 1615)
- October 21 – Alexander Seton, 1st Viscount of Kingston, Scottish Royalist (b. 1620)
- October 25 – George Legge, 1st Baron Dartmouth, English naval commander (b. 1647)
- October 30
  - Hermann of Baden-Baden, Imperial field marshal and president of the Hofkriegsrat (b. 1628)
  - Henry Maurice, Welsh priest (b. 1647)
- November 7 – Pieter Cornelisz van Slingelandt, Dutch Golden Age painter (b. 1640)
- November 14 – Tosa Mitsuoki, Japanese painter (b. 1617)
- November 15 – Aelbert Cuyp, Dutch landscape painter (b. 1620)
- November 18 – Sir John Brookes, 1st Baronet, Member of Parliament (b. 1635)
- December – Louis de Vanens, French alchemist and poisoner (b. 1647)
- December 1
  - Thomas Brand, English minister (b. 1635)
  - Louis Henri de Pardaillan de Gondrin, French noble (b. 1640)
- December 8
  - Richard Baxter, English Puritan church leader, poet, and hymn-writer (b. 1615)
  - Michel Le Clerc, French lawyer, dramatist and playwright (b. 1622)
- December 15 – Hendrik van Rheede, Dutch botanist (b. 1637)
- December 23 – Katherine Jones, Viscountess Ranelagh, Anglo-Irish scientist (b. 1615)
- December 31
  - Robert Boyle, Anglo-Irish natural philosopher, chemist, physicist, and inventor (b. 1627)
  - Dudley North, English economist, merchant and politician (b. 1641)
- date unknown
  - Bárbara Coronel, Spanish stage actress (b. 1632)
  - Mariyam Kaba'afa'anu Rani Kilege, queen mother and regent of the Maldives
- probable – Elizabeth Polwheele, English playwright (b. c. 1651)

== See also ==
- Upside down year
