= Jean Bartholominat, La Chaboissiere =

Jean Bartholominat, La Chaboissiere (died 16 July 1682) was a French poisoner. He is known for his involvement in the Poison Affair, which lasted from 1677 to 1682.

== Career ==
La Chaboissiere was employed as the footman or valet of the alchemist Louis de Vanens. He was a member of the alchemist group of Vanens, and was involved in producing and selling poisons.

In 1676, the Vanens alchemist group settled in Paris. The group, originally composed by Louis de Vanens, Robert de Bachimont, Marie de Bachimont, François Galaup de Chasteuil and Jean Bartholominat, La Chaboissiere, was expanded in Paris to include Doctor Rabel, the secretary and banker Pierre Cadelan, the alchemist P. Dalmas, and the lawyer Jean Terron du Clausel. On 5 December 1677, Louis de Vanens was arrested, followed by the arrest of the rest of the alchemist group with the exception of Chasteuil, who had died shortly prior, and doctor Rabel, who managed to flee to England. The arrest of the alchemist group was closely related to the beginning of the Poison Affair. They were imprisoned in the Bastille.

Catherine Leroy, mistress of La Chaboissiere, and Louise Dusoulcye, mistress of P. Dalmas, both testified that the alchemist group in fact produced and sold deadly poison and performed contract murders. Leroy stated that she had wittnessed La Chaboissiere produce poison, that he had once made an unsuccessful attempt to poison her to silence her, and that she had herself performed two poison murders on commission upon his orders, and thus murdered a La Regnault and a Mme Carré; and that Louise Dusoulcye had poisoned a man by the name La Levasseur with poisoned plums. Her testimony was seen as very significant. Leroy also named several of the people that had been poisoned on commission by the group, and that they had an international clientele, and contacts with the Ducal court of Savoy.

Jean Bartholominat, La Chaboissiere was found guilty for murder and sentenced to death. He was the last person to be executed during the Poison Affair. He was executed on 16 July 1682.
