= François Galaup de Chasteuil =

François Galaup de Chasteuil (1625–1677) was a French poisoner. He is known for his involvement in the Affair of the Poisons (1677-1682).

== Career ==
François Galaup de Chasteuil was born to the lawyer Jean Galaup de Chasteuil of the Aix court. He became doctor in law, and was a member of the Sovereign Military Order of Malta from 1644.

As a member of the Sovereign Military Order of Malta he served, from 1652, in the war between Malta and the Barbary corsairs. He was captured by the barbary corsairs and kept in slavery in Alger for two years before he was able to return to France. After his return to France, he became a monk of the Carmelite order in Marseilles. During his time as a monk, he kidnapped a girl who he kept prisoner in his cell until she gave birth to a child, after which he killed and buried her. After having strangled her, however, he was discovered when he attempted to bury her body. He was arrested for the murder of the girl and sentenced to death, but was saved due to the contacts of the alchemist Louis de Vanens.

He became a member of the alchemist group of Louis de Vanens, Robert de Bachimont and Marie de Bachimont, and worked with them in Nice to find the secret of the Philosopher's stone. For a period of time, he was engaged as a teacher of the her to the throne of Savoy. In parallel, he continued his work in the Vanens alchemist group.

In 1676, the Vanens alchemist group settled in Paris. The group, originally composed by Louis de Vanens, Robert de Bachimont, Marie de Bachimont, François Galaup de Chasteuil and Jean Bartholominat, La Chaboissiere, was expanded in Paris to include Doctor Rabel, the secretary and banker Pierre Cadelan, the alchemist P. Dalmas, and the lawyer Jean Terron du Clausel. On 5 December 1677, Louis de Vanens was arrested, followed by the arrest of the rest of the alchemist group with the exception of Chasteuil, who had died shortly prior, and doctor Rabel, who managed to flee to England. The arrest of the alchemist group was closely related to the beginning of the Poison Affair.
