= ESAD de Reims =

Art school in Reims, France

Coordinates: 49.2524°N 4.0297°E

The École Supérieure d'Art et de Design de Reims is a college of art and design in Reims, France.

== History ==
The school of fine arts was founded in 1748 by Reims local government. Its founder, Louis-Jean Lévesque de Pouilly, sought to attract artists, architects and craftsmen from France and neighbouring countries.

In 1992, the French Minister of Culture and the town of Reims declared the school a college of fine arts and design. The college manager, Gervais Jassaud, recruited practicing designers as teaching staff.

The school offers courses in graphic, multimedia, product and furniture design, as well as studies in fine art. ESAD offers both bachelor's and master's degrees.

ESAD has approximately 200 students and 40 permanent teaching staff, as well as visiting artists and lecturers.

== Location ==
The school is located in Reims town centre, near Notre Dame Cathedral.

== Logo ==
The college logo was designed by Jean-Charles Amey in 2006. The logo was inspired by simple geometric form. Its derivation into a typeface and layout structure refers to a process of translating two dimensions into volume.

== International programmes ==
ESAD participates in Erasmus university exchange programmes, allowing students and staff to work at partner institutions including:

- HBKSaar, Saarbrücken, Germany;
- George Enescu University of Arts of Iaşi, Iaşi, Romania;
- Ecole Supérieure d’Art Visuel de La Cambre, Brussels, Belgium;
- Danmarks Designskole, Copenhagen, Denmark;
- Istanbul Technical University, Istanbul, Turkey;
- Technical Educational Institute of Athens, Athens, Greece;
- EASD Valencia, Valencia, Spain;
- Escola Superior de Disseny, Barcelona, Spain;
- VUT Brno, Brno, Czech Republic;
- ISIA Faenza, Faenza, Italy.
