= Louis-Jean Lévesque de Pouilly =

French philosopher

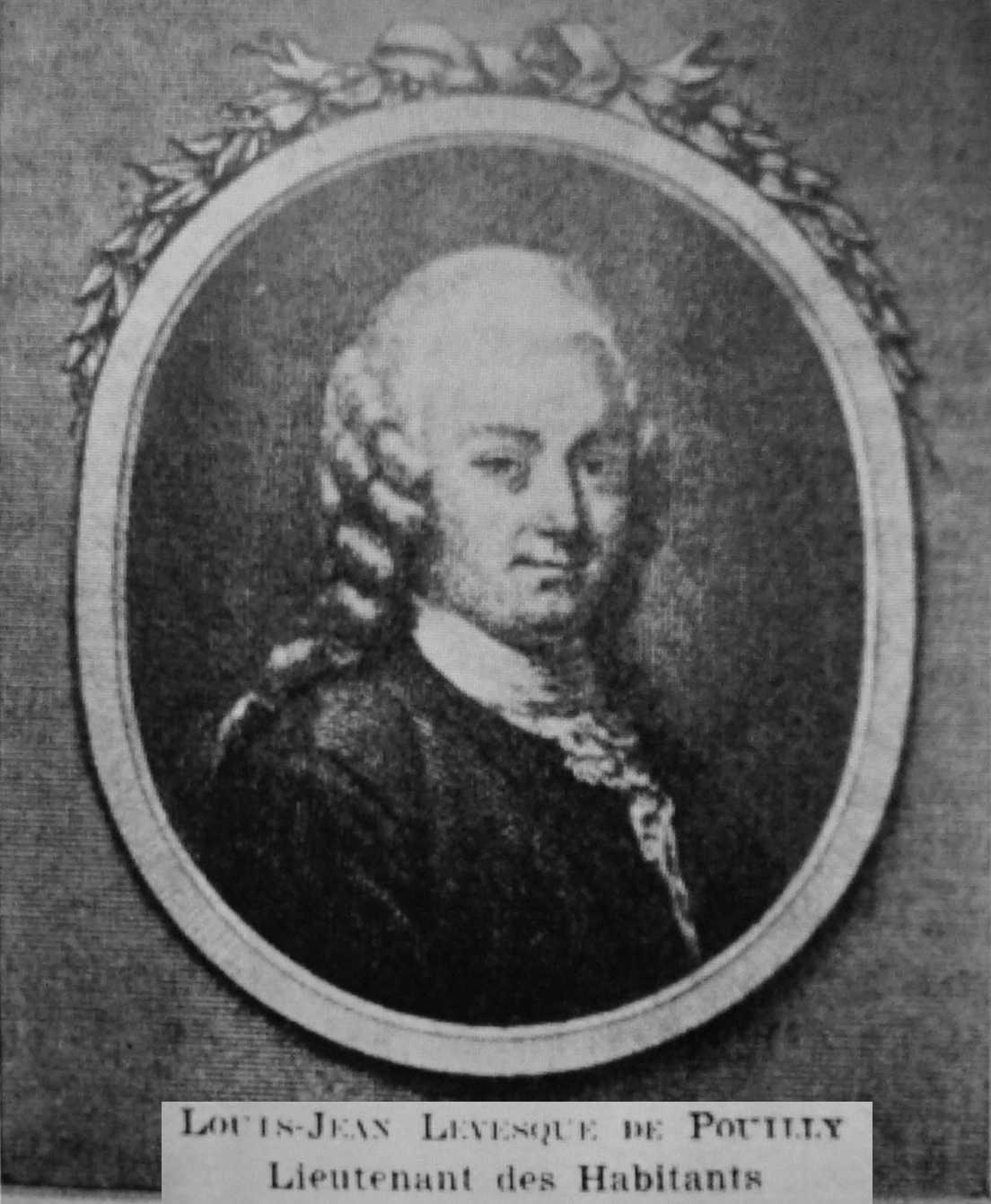

Louis-Jean Lévesque de Pouilly (1691, Reims – 1750, Paris) was a French philosopher. A member of the Académie des Inscriptions et Belles-Lettres, he founded the ESAD de Reims.

Lévesque de Pouilly studied philosophy and literature in Paris. He was a friend of Nicolas Fréret and Lord Bolingbroke, met Isaac Newton in England, and is likely to have hosted David Hume in Reims.

== Works ==
- Dissertation sur l'incertitude de l'histoire des premiers siècles de Rome, 1723
- Théorie des sentiments agréables, 1736.
