= Franz Hunolt =

Franz Hunolt (also Humold or Hunoldt; 31 March 1691, at Siegen – 12 September 1746, at Trier) was a German Catholic priest and preacher.

== Life ==
At the age of nine years, Hunolt entered the Jesuit college of his native town; six years later, he attended the Jesuit school at Cologne to study philosophy. Having completed the three years' course as master of arts, he entered the Society of Jesus there on 18 May.

After a novitiate of two years at Trier, Hunolt was sent to Geyst (near Münster, in Westphalia) for one year to prepare himself to teach. After this, he taught in the gymnasium at Cologne and also at Aachen, to the complete satisfaction of his superiors (summâ cum laude), being at the same time spiritual director of the junior Sodality. Having completed the theological course of four years and received Holy Orders, he should then have made his tertianship, or third year of probation, but was, during most of that period, employed in giving popular missions. His next appointment was to the chair of logic at Coblenz, where he made his profession, 15 August 1724.

Hunolt was then assigned to the cathedral pulpit at Trier, and continued in that employment for nineteen years. Besides this he was much sought after as a confessor, and he also became chaplain of the city prison. Chronic weakness of the heart eventually rendered it impossible for him to preach; consequently, in 1743, he was transferred to the position of master of novices at Trier, and died there three years later.

== Work ==
Hunolt's great collection of sermons is still widely used. No fewer than six folio editions of the original work appeared between 1740 and 1813. After the latter date, versions in more modern German began to be published; one in twenty-five volumes appeared at Ratisbon, 1842–47; another modern version appeared about the same time at Graz, in twenty-four volumes. There have been several editions of both the Ratisbon version and the Graz, while abridgements and selected sermons have been frequently republished. It has been translated in Dutch, French, and Polish; an English version in twelve volumes was completed in 1898.

Each of the six volumes contains seventy-two sermons, and the various divisions in each volume are indicated by sub-titles, such as "The Christian Attitude towards Life"; "The Wicked Christian"; "The Penitent Christian"; "The Good Christian"; "The Last End of Christians"; "The Christian's Model". This material is distributed across the ecclesiastical year.

Franz Xaver Kraus describes Hunolt's sermons as follows:

"At a time when German pulpit oratory had degenerated into utter bad taste and brainless insipidity, these sermons are distinguished by noble simplicity, pure Christian sentiment, and genuine apostolic ideas no less than by the felicitous use of Holy Writ, abundance of thought and pregnant language."
