= Louis de Vanens =

French alchemist and poisoner (1647–1691)

Louis de Vanens (1647 – December 1691) was a French alchemist and poisoner. He was implicated in the Affair of the Poisons. It was owing to the connection between him and Magdelaine de La Grange that the Paris police came to suspect the existence of an illegal organization of poisoners in Paris.

== Activity ==
Louis de Vanens came from Arles and called himself Chevalier de Vanens.

In 1676, the Vanens alchemist group settled in Paris. The group, originally composed by Louis de Vanens, Robert de Bachimont, Marie de Bachimont, François Galaup de Chasteuil and Jean Bartholominat, La Chaboissiere, was expanded in Paris to include Doctor Rabel, the secretary and banker Pierre Cadelan, the alchemist P. Dalmas, and the lawyer Jean Terron du Clausel.

On 5 December 1677, Louis de Vanens was arrested, followed by the arrest of the rest of the alchemist group with the exception of Chasteuil, who had died shortly prior, and doctor Rabel, who managed to flee to England. The arrest of the alchemist group was closely related to the beginning of the Poison Affair.

Louis de Vanens was arrested by the direct orders of Louvois on 5 December 1677, after having declared that he was able to make gold and had been observed with a banknote of 200,000 livres. In connection to his arrest, his valet La Chaboissiere and the banker Pierre Cadelan, who signed the banknote, were taken into custody. In 1678, La Chaboissiere's lover, Jeanne Leroy, was arrested along with chemist Dalmas and his lover, Louise Duscoulcye. Leroy testified that Chaboissiere and Vanens were commissioned poisoners and that Cadelan sold their poisons abroad. She further confessed that she and Duscoulcye had committed murder. It was known that Chaboissiere had visited Abbé Nail, an accomplice of the poisoner Magdelaine de La Grange, in prison. This formed a link between Vanens and de La Grange and caused the Paris police suspect Vanens of being the leader of an international organization of assassins, and part of a network of poisoners in Paris.

== Implication ==
On May 17, 1678, the nobleman Robert de Bachimont and his wife, Marie, were arrested in Lyon for their connection to Vanens. They claimed that they had become acquainted with Vanens in Paris in 1674, where they witnessed him transform metal into gold. Vanens reportedly told them that he had learned alchemy from Francois Galaup de Chasteuil. The Bachimonts testified that in June 1675, they accompanied Vanens to visit Chasteuil in Turin to acquire an alchemical ingredient which Vanens required. Vanens and Chasteuil met alone. Upon their return to France, Vanens disappeared in Paris. The couple later returned to Turin where they again met with Chasteuil to engage in alchemical experiments. By the time the Bachimonts had returned to Lyon, the Police suspected that Vanens and the Bachimonts had poisoned Charles Emmanuel II, Duke of Savoy, who had died two days after their departure from Turin, and that the Bachimonts had returned to Turin the second time to fetch their reward. The official report of the death of the Duke of Savoy was brought to France by the Count de Saint Maurice, lover of the late Duke's widow, Marie Jeanne of Savoy. Saint Maurice visited La Chaubossiere during his stay in Paris.

== Investigation ==
Vanens was imprisoned in the Bastille for several years without trial during the Poison Affair while the police waited for evidence to incriminate him. Although he was connected to many of the accused, no charges were brought against him. He was put on trial in April 1682. By this time, he was described as being severely mentally deteriorated, perhaps mentally ill. He was accused of having sold mixtures to prolong love, affect marriages, and find lost treasures. The suspicion that he may have murdered the Duke of Savoy was not mentioned as it was deemed internationally sensitive. Although he was initially sentenced to the galleys, the fear that he would talk about the murder of the Duke of Savoy caused the sentenced to be changed to life imprisonment at St Andre de Salines in France-Comte, where he was joined by Roger and Marie de Bachimont. Pierre Cadelan also received the same sentence. Leroy and Chaubossiere were executed, while Dalmas was sent to a work house.
