= Peder von Todderud =

- Born: 17 July 1691; Stange, Norway
- Died: 30 May 1772 (aged 80); Vang, Norway
- Occupations: military officer and landowner

Peder von Todderud (17 July 1691 – 30 May 1772) was a Norwegian military officer and landowner.

== Personal life ==
Todderud was born in Stange on 17 July 1691. He was the son of farmers Gulbrand Alfssøn and Birte Johannesdatter, and married Maren Olsdatter in 1720.

== Career ==
Todderud started his military career in 1707. In 1750 he was promoted colonel and chief of Oppland Regiment. He was promoted major general in 1760, and retired in 1764. In 1751 von Todderud acquired the estate Åker in Vang, where he lived until his death in 1772.
