= Lavater brothers =

The Lavater brothers were Johann Heinrich Lavater (baptised 21 February 1611 – 9 June 1691) and Johann Jacob Lavater (1594–1636), both Swiss physicians and naturalists.

== Biography ==
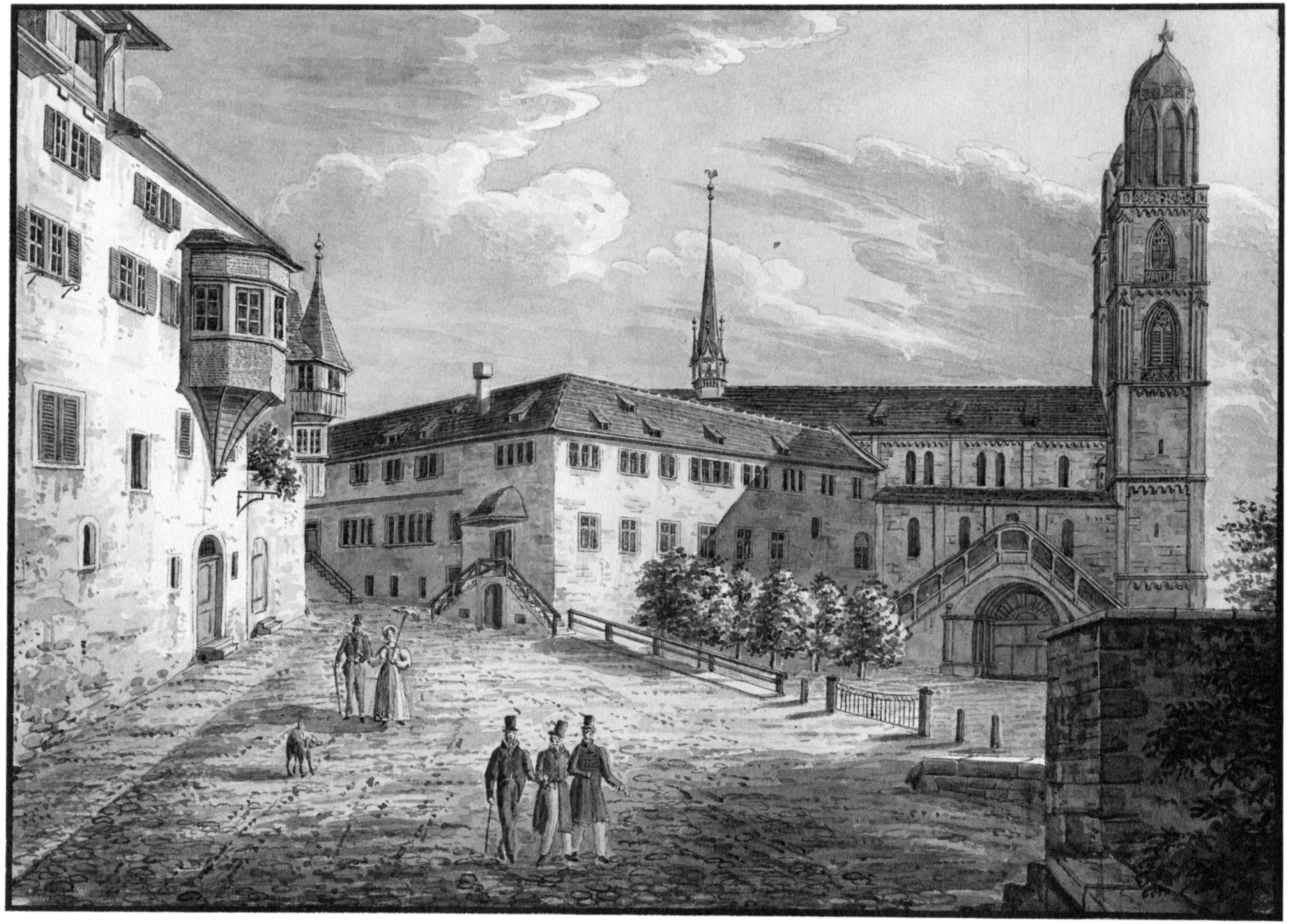
Johann Heinrich Lavater was a professor at the Carolinum, Zürich, here shown in front of the Grossmünster. Sepia drawing by Emil Schulhess, 1835

The brothers were the sons of Heinrich Lavater, also a physician, and a professor of physics and mathematics in Zürich.

Johann Heinrich gained his doctorate in Basel in 1647, and became a physician in Bern in 1653. In 1668 he prepared the Zürich Ordinance about plague. He became professor of medicine and natural history at the Carolinum, Zürich.

Little is known of Johann Jacob, except that he too was a physician and a naturalist.

== Legacy ==
Joseph Pitton de Tournefort named the genus Lavatera (tree mallows) in the Malvaceae in their honour in 1753.
