= Manzanillo Port =

Manzanillo Port is located in Manzanillo, Monte Cristi Province, Dominican Republic. It is on the border of Haiti.

== Overview ==
Port of Manzanillo was built in the 1950s by the Dominican Fruit Company (La Grenada), a North American company dedicated to export bananas and other minor fruits of the country.

This harbor currently is under a leasing-trade for its reconstruction and still been supervised by the Dominican Port Authority.

Its operations are based on deplaning clinker, material for concrete, exportation of domestic products such as animals, fruits and food to Europe and sometimes general cargo and container cargo operations.

== Port information ==
- Location: 19°42′25″N 71°44′35″W
- Local time: UTC−4
- Weather/climate/prevailing winds: From May 15 until September 15
- Climate: mostly sunny, tropical. Hurricane season runs from June to November
- Prevailing winds: direction ENE–ESE
- Average temperature range: 28–30 °C.

== See also ==
- List of ports and harbours of the Atlantic Ocean
