= Nimavar school =

Nimavar School مدرسه نیماورد
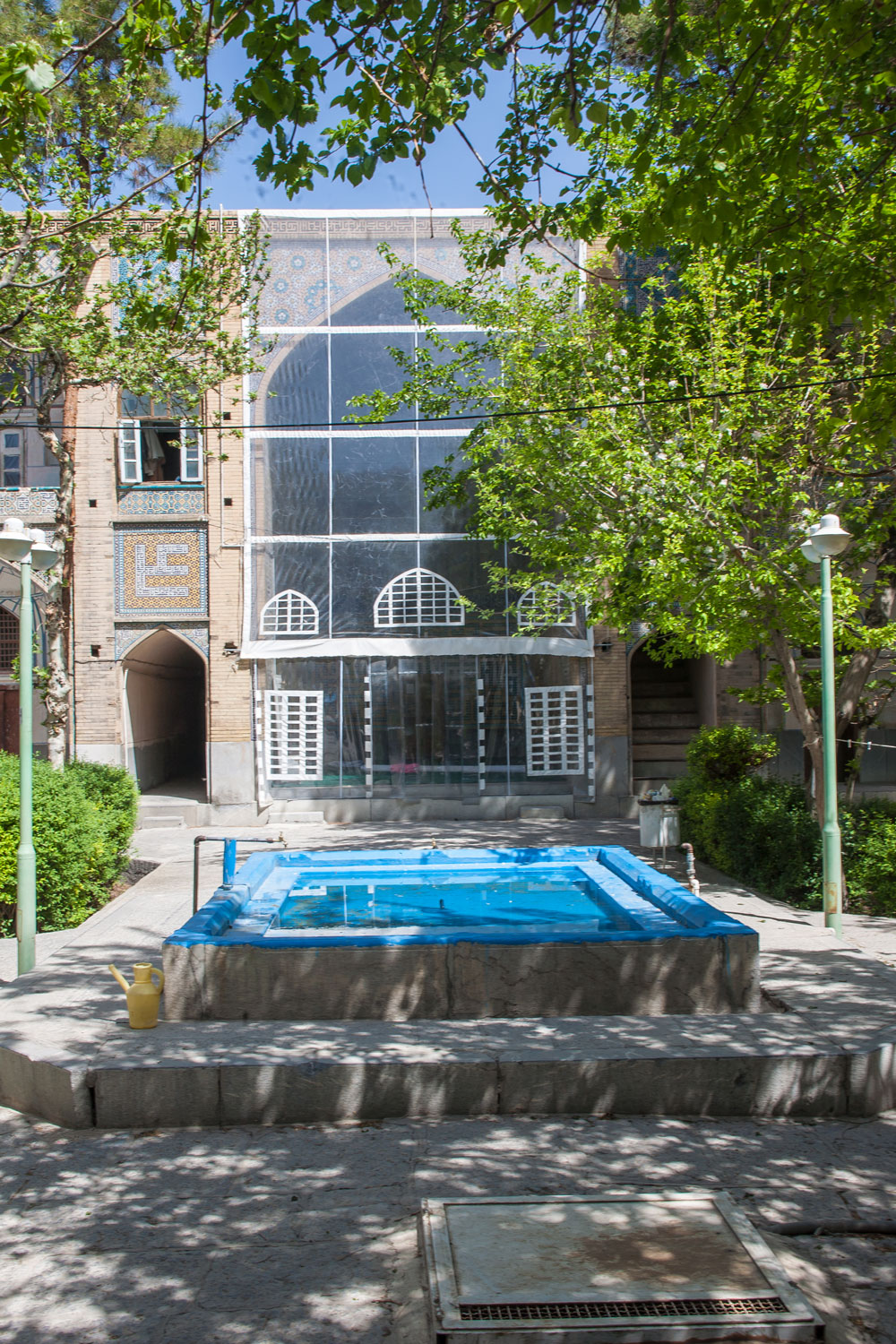

- Location within Iran

Religion
- Province: Isfahan

Location
- Location: Nimavar Bazaar, Isfahan, Iran
- Municipality: Isfahan
- Coordinates: 32.6658°N 51.6744°E

Architecture
- Type: School
- Style: Isfahani
- Designated as NHL

Iran National Heritage List
- Official name: Nimavard Religious School
- Type: Religious School
- Designated: 1951
- Reference no.: 378
- Conservation organization: Cultural Heritage, Handicrafts and Tourism Organization of Iran

Nimavar School (Persian: مدرسه نیماورد) is a historical school in Isfahan, Iran. It's located in Nimavar Bazaar and belongs to Safavid era. This school was built in 1691 in the era of Suleiman I.
