= Louis-Basile de Bernage =

Louis-Basile de Bernage Seigneur de Saint-Maurice, Vaux, Chassy
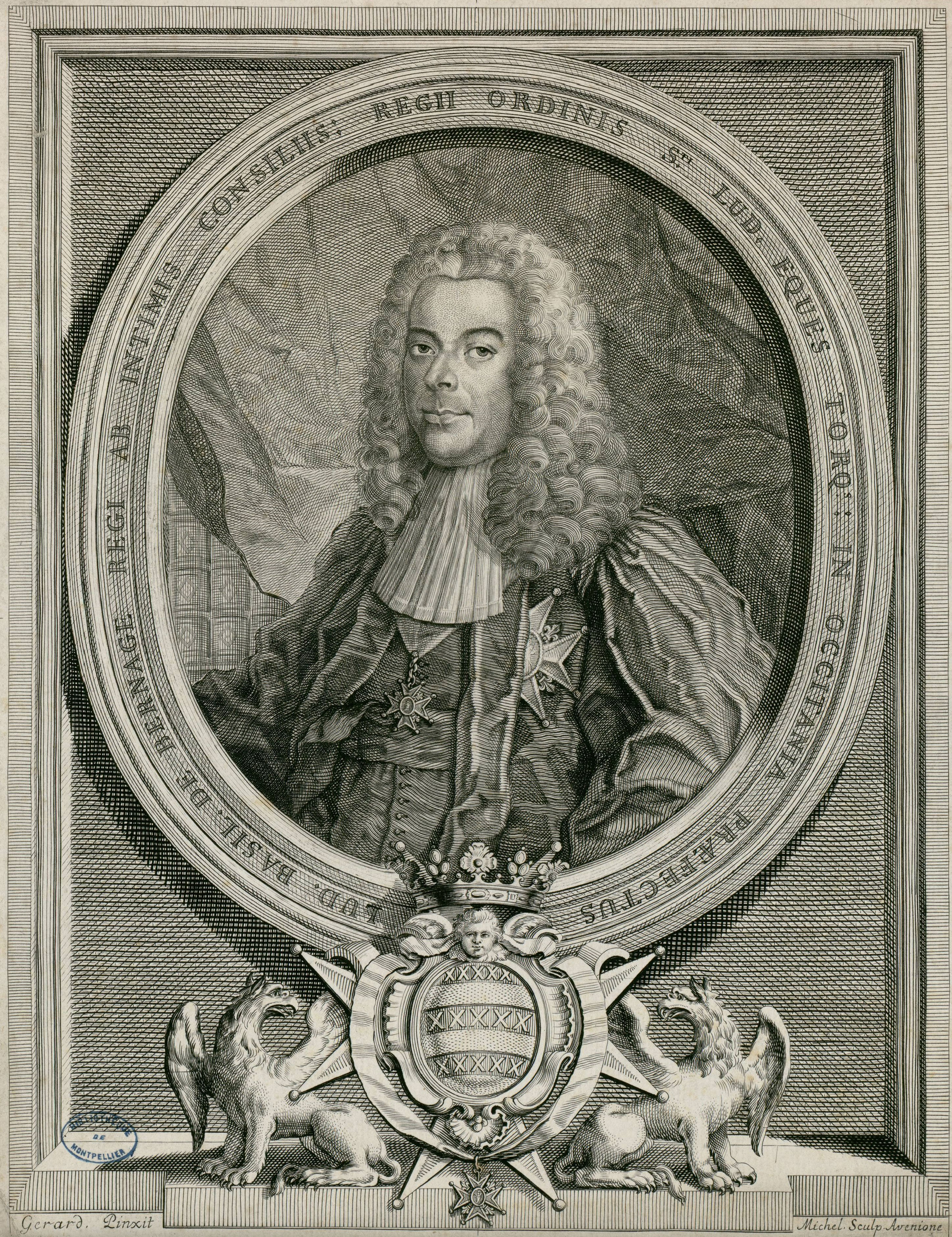
- Louis-Basile de Bernage

Prévôt des Marchands, Paris
- In office 1743–1757
- Preceded by: Félix Aubery
- Succeeded by: Jean-Baptiste de Pontcarré de Viarmes

Personal details
- Born: 1691 Paris
- Died: 12 May 1767 (aged 76) Paris
- Awards: Grand Croix de l'Ordre Royal et Militaire de Saint-Louis

Louis-Basile de Bernage (baptized 4 February 1691, Paris; died 12 May 1767, Paris) was a French aristocrat, seigneur of Saint-Maurice, Vaux, and Chassy, and a politician under the ancien régime. From 1743 to 1757, he was the Prévot des Marchands (Provost of Merchants, a post equivalent to mayor) of Paris.

== Parents ==
His father was Louis de Bernage (1663–1737), a councilor of the Grand Conseil, and his mother was Anne-Marie Rouillé (c. 1664 – 1755), daughter of Louis Rouillé, secretary of the king and Controller General of the Post.

== Political career ==
In 1712, Bernage became an avocat général (magistrate) of the tribunal of the Requêtes de l'Hôtel, a court located in the Palais de Justice. In 1714, he was elevated to maitre des requêtes (Master of Requests).

Intendant of Montauban in 1720 and 1723, he succeeded his father as intendant of Languedoc from 1725 to 1743.

A Conseiller d'État on a semester basis in 1734 and an ordinary in 1743, he was Prévôt des Marchands of Paris from 26 July 1743 to August 1757. In this capacity, he acted as the director of the Opéra from August 1749 to 28 November 1753, when the position was assigned to Eugène de Thuret, who had previously been the director in the 1730s. Bernage, however, as Prévôt des Marchands, continued to supervise the management of the Opéra for the eight years it was administered by the City of Paris.

He was a recipient of the Grand Croix of the Ordre Royal et Militaire de Saint-Louis.

== Descendants ==
He married Marie Anne Moreau on 11 February 1714. Their children included:

- Anne Marie Renée de Bernage de Vaux de Bernage (1714–1786)
- Jean Louis de Bernage de Saint-Maurice (1716–1780), Conseiller d’État, Grand Croix de l'Ordre Royal et Militaire de Saint-Louis
- Élisabeth Jeanne Thérèse de Bernage de Saint-Maurice

== Bibliography ==
- Aubert de La Chesnaye Des Bois, François-Alexandre de (1771). "Louis-Basile de Bernage", vol. 2, p. 354, in Dictionnaire de la noblesse, contenant les généalogies, l'histoire et la chronologie des familles nobles de France, second edition. Paris: Veuve Duchesne.
- Charlton, David (2014). "New Light on the Bouffons in Paris (1752–1754)", Eighteenth-Century Music, vol. 11, no. 1, pp. 31–54.
