= Jan Francisci =

Slovak organist and composer

Jan Francisci (14 June 1691 – 27 April 1758) was an organist and composer born in Neusohl, Kingdom of Hungary (now Banská Bystrica, Slovakia). In 1709, he succeeded his father as cantor there before going to Vienna in 1722. He visited J.S. Bach in Leipzig in 1725. He worked as a church musician in (Pressburg) (now Bratislava) until 1735, when he returned to Neusohl. He remained there until his death, except for the years 1743–1748.
