= Johann Friedrich Weidler =

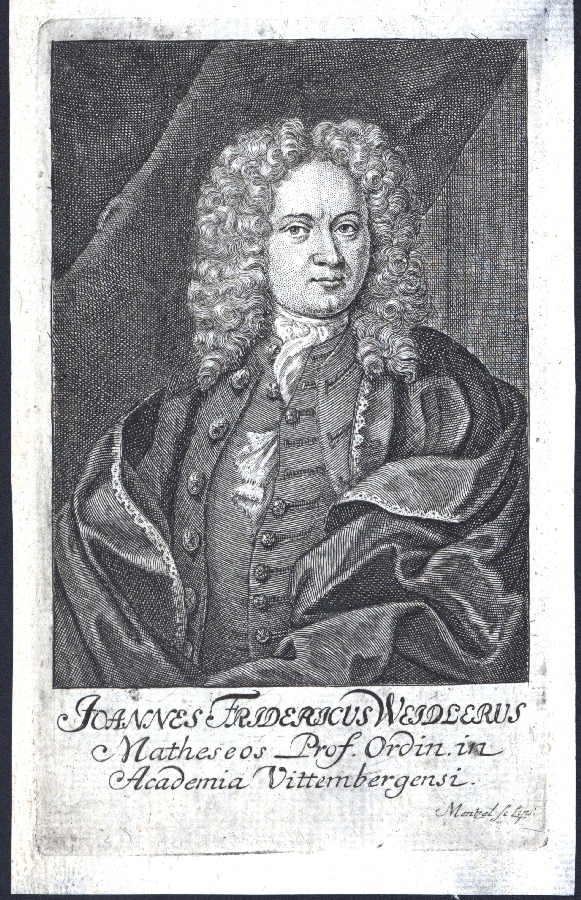
Johann Friedrich Weidler

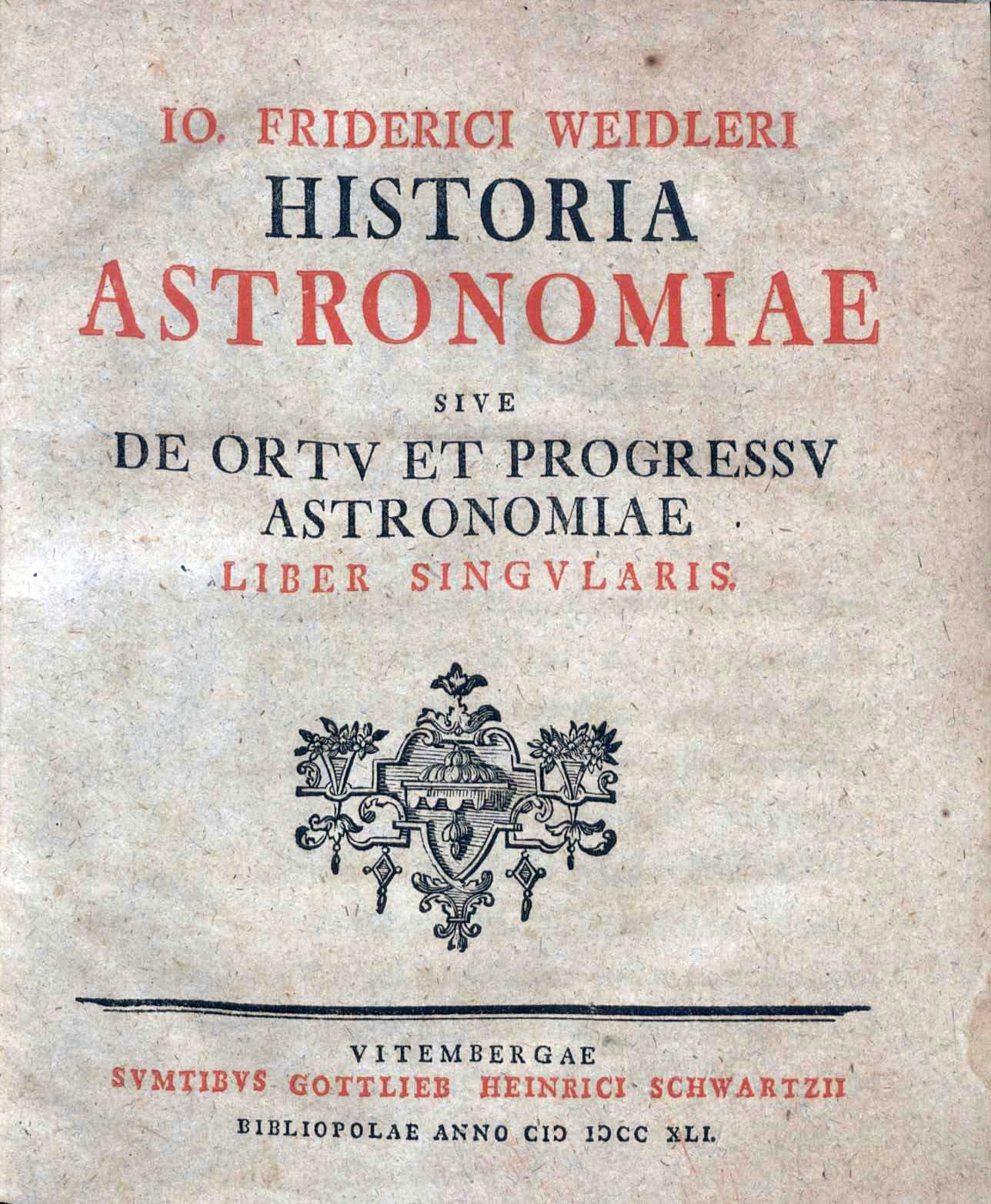
Historia astronomiae, 1755

Johann Friedrich Weidler (13 April 1691 in Großneuhausen – 13 November 1755 in Wittenberg) was a German jurist and mathematician.

== Biography ==
At the age of fifteen Weidler moved to the University of Jena, enrolled on June 10, 1712 at the University of Wittenberg, obtained the academic degree of Magister on April 30, 1712 and became an adjunct at the philosophical faculty of the Wittenberg Academy on April 19, 1715. After he had been given the professorship of lower mathematics in 1715, he took over the professorship of higher mathematics in 1719.

In 1726 and 1727 he interrupted his teaching to travel to Holland, England, France and Switzerland. In Basel he received his doctorate in law in 1727. He returned to Wittenberg and took on an extraordinary professorship at the law faculty. Nevertheless, his academic work was devoted to the mathematical discipline. Fearing that he would wear himself out in both disciplines, he then devoted his entire energy to the natural sciences.

Of the compendiums that he wrote as the basis of his lectures, the Institutiones mathematicae, which also included astronomy, received so much attention that they were published five times during Weidler's lifetime and had further editions after his death. With the Institutiones subterraneae, Weidler created the first scientific compendium of the art of mine surveying.

But his greatest work was the history of his favorite subject, astronomy, which contains a wealth of biographical and bibliographical data. Entitled Historia Astronomiae sive de Ortu et Progressu Astronomiae. Liber Singularis and published in Wittenberg in 1741, it was the first, complete history of astronomy. Weidler complemented it in 1755 with Bibliographia Astronomica; temporis quo libri vel compositi vel editi sunt, ordine servato: ad supplendam et illustrandam astronomiae Historiam digesta, a work that served as a basis for Lalande's own astronomical bibliography.

He also wrote a description of the transits of Mercury through the sun in 1736 and 1747 and a calculation of the longitude and latitude of the city of Wittenberg, over which work his death overtook him.

== Selected works ==
- Diss. De scepsi physica. (Resp. Rudolph Paul Pfeiffer) Creusig, Wittenberg 1712.
- Habacuci Prophetae De Messia Testimonium Capitis III, v. XIII. A R. Isaaci Abarbanelis Glossemate Liberatum. (Resp. Benkamin Hoener) Schroeder, Wittenberg 1712.
- De Distantiis Locorvm In Geographia Accvrate Cognoscendis. (Resp. Johann Christoph Greibzieg) Creusig, Wittenberg 1713.
- Schediasma in quo Apollonio Pergaeo doctrinae curvarum promotae gloriam vindicat. Wittenberg 1715.
- Institutiones mathematicae decem et sex purae mixtaeque matheseos disciplinas complexae. Hannau, Wittenberg 1718.
- Historia astronomiae, sive: De ortu et progressu astronomiae liber singularis. Schwartz, Wittenberg 1741.
- Bibliographia Astronomica; temporis quo libri vel compositi vel editi sunt, ordine servato: ad supplendam et illustrandam astronomiae Historiam digesta. Schwartz, Wittenberg 1755.
- Institutiones geometriae subterraneae. Gerdes, Wittenberg 1726.
