= Francesco Alborea =

Italian composer

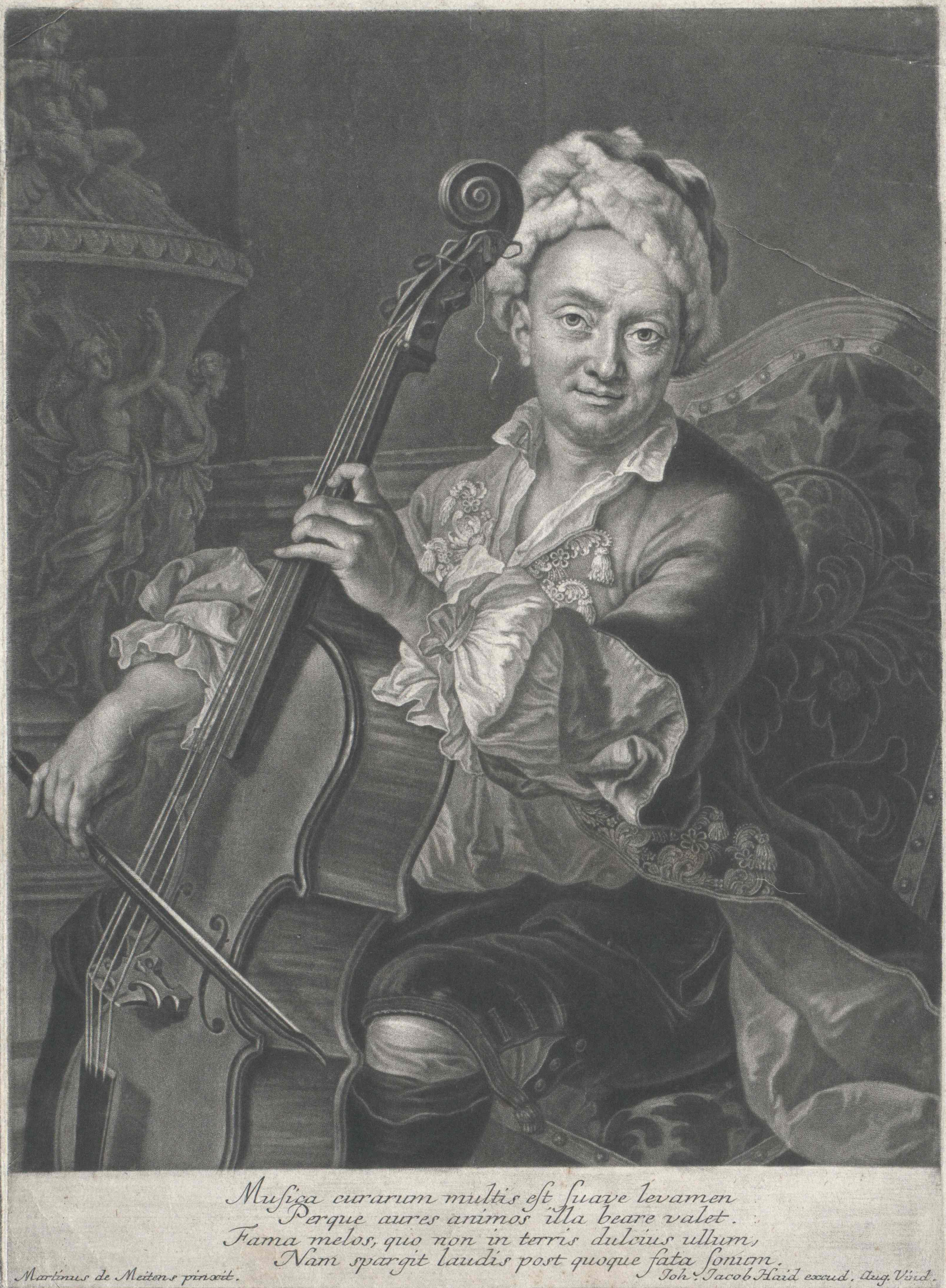
Francesco Alborea, engraving by Johann Jakob Haid from a portrait by Martin van Meytens kept in Wien, Österreichische Nationalbibliothek

Francesco Alborea (Naples, 7 March 1691 – Padova, 20 July 1739) was an Italian cellist.

== Biography and career ==
Son of Emanuele and Aloisa Bassano, at the age of ten was admitted to the conservatorio S. Maria di Loreto where he studied music for twelve years under de:Gian Carlo Cailò.

With the support of Alessandro Scarlatti, Alborea became member of the Regia Cappella di Napoli until 1727. In the same year, he moved to Vienna, where was employed as cellist at the imperial court, with a salary of 1260 florins, until his death.

Alborea was one of the first virtuoso soloist cellists. As referred by Ernst Ludwig Gerber and François-Joseph Fétis, Francesco Geminiani reported that in 1713, in Rome, Alborea played the cello in a cantata with violoncello obbligato composed by Alessandro Scarlatti, the author playing the harpsichord. At the end of the piece, Scarlatti declared that only an angel, in human form, could play in such a charming way. Alborea was praised, among others, by Johann Joachim Quantz, Franz Benda and Martin Berteau, who, according to Fétis, left the viola da gamba for the cello after hearing Alborea playing. The name Franciscello or Francischello did not refer to Alborea, but to his son Emanuele who was also a cellist at the Vienna court.

In a big painting by Nicola Maria Rossi representing the celebration of the "Four Altars", the musicians of the Cappella Reale of Naples are portrayed, among them Francesco Mancini, Domenico Sarro and Francesco Alborea playing his celebrated violoncello

== Works ==
According to Gerber, Alborea published in Vienna, anonymously, some of his own compositions for the cello, now lost. Two manuscript sonatas by him, in C and D, are in the National Library of the Czech Republic.
