= Dudley Colley =

Irish politician

- Born: c. 1621
- Died: July 1674
- Occupation: Member of Parliament
- Spouse: Anne Warren
- Parent(s): Sir Henry Colley; Anne Peyton

Dudley Colley (ca. 1621 – July 1674) was an Irish Member of Parliament.

He was the son of Sir Henry Colley (ca. 1585-1637) and Anne Peyton, daughter of Sir Christopher Peyton. The Colley or Cowley family had come to Ireland from Rutland about 1500 and produced a line of Crown servants and soldiers. Dudley's great-grandfather Sir Henry Colley acquired Carbury Castle in 1554. Dudley's father acquired substantial lands in County Wexford.

He represented Philipstown in the Irish House of Commons during the Parliament of Charles II.

By his marriage to Anne Warren he was father of Henry Colley and grandfather of Henry Colley, Garret Wesley, and Richard Wesley, 1st Baron Mornington, all of whom also sat in the Irish House of Commons.

He was the great-great-grandfather of Arthur Wellesley, 1st Duke of Wellington.
