= Henry Burnell =

Henry Burnell may refer to:

- Henry Burnell (author) (died 1650s), Irish politician, playwright and landowner
- Henry Burnell (cricketer) (1853–1910), English cricketer and barrister
- Henry Burnell (judge and politician) (c. 1540–1614), Irish judge and politician; grandfather of the Irish author
