= Henry Colley (died 1719) =

Irish politician and from 1698 to 1699 MP for County Kildare (1648–1719)

Member of Parliament for County Kildare
- In office 1698–1699 Serving with George FitzGerald
- Preceded by: Robert FitzGerald; George FitzGerald
- Succeeded by: Thomas Keightley; Sir Kildare Borrowes, 3rd Bt

Personal details
- Born: 1648
- Died: 1719 (aged 70–71)
- Spouse: Mary Ussher (after 1694)
- Children: Henry Colley (died 1723); Richard Wesley, 1st Baron Mornington; Anne Colley
- Parent(s): Dudley Colley; Anne Warren

Henry Colley (1648–1719) was an Irish Member of Parliament. (Note: Henry Colley' was also known as Henry Cowley.)

== Early life ==
Henry Colley, born in 1648, was the son of Dudley Colley, MP for Philipstown, and the former Anne Warren, daughter of Henry Warren.

His paternal grandparents were the former Anne Peyton (the daughter of Sir Christopher Peyton) and Sir Henry Colley, who acquired substantial lands in County Wexford.

== Education ==
Colley was educated at Trinity College Dublin.

== Career ==
Colley represented County Kildare from 1698 to 1699.

== Personal life ==
In 1705, Henry Colley erected a monument, in Carberry Castle's church in County Kildare, to his father Dudley, which said, "Henry Colley, now living, son of Dudley Colley, married Mary Ussher, and had issue by her six sons and six daughters; whereof two sons, Henry and Richard, and six daughters, are now living. She was the only daughter of Sir William Ussher of Bridgefoot, Knt. by his Lady Ursula St. Barb, and lyeth here interred". Sir William Ussher was MP for County Dublin, and Ursula St. Barbe was a daughter of Capt. George St. Barbe. The children of Henry Colley and Mary Ussher included:

- Henry Colley (c. 1685–1723), who married Lady Mary Hamilton, daughter of James Hamilton, 6th Earl of Abercorn.
- Richard Colley (c. 1690–1758), who became Baron Mornington; he adopted the name Wesley (Wellesley) upon the inheritance of the estates of his cousin Garret Wesley (d. 1728); he also took the name in right of his wife Elizabeth Sale (d. 1738) as the Wellesley heiress through her grandmother, Catherine Wellesley Cusack (d. 1598), daughter of Thomas Cusack, Lord Chancellor of Ireland, who was the son of Alison de Wellesley. Richard and Elizabeth Wellesley were the parents of Garret Wesley, 1st Earl of Mornington, who was in turn the father of Arthur Wellesley, Duke of Wellington.
- Anne Colley, who married a William Pole, a son of Periam Pole and Sarah Blount; their son William married Lady Sarah Moore (a daughter of Edward Moore, 5th Earl of Drogheda) and upon his death, he left his estate to his kinsman, William Wellesley, 3rd Earl of Mornington, who took the surname Wellesley-Pole.

Colley, who lived at Carbury Castle, County Kildare, died in 1719. His will was written on 18 June 1719 and proved on 27 July 1719.

Parliament of Ireland
Preceded by Robert FitzGerald; George FitzGerald	Member of Parliament for County Kildare; 1698–1699; With: George FitzGerald	Succeeded by Thomas Keightley; Sir Kildare Borrowes, 3rd Bt
