= Walter Cowley =

First Principal Solicitor for Ireland

- Born: c. 1500; Rutland, England
- Died: 1548
- Occupations: lawyer, politician
- Children: 2 sons incl. Henry Colley
- Parent(s): Robert Cowley

Walter Cowley (c.1500 – 1548) was an Irish lawyer and politician who was the first holder of the office of Principal Solicitor for Ireland, which was created for him. He was a client of Thomas Cromwell, and later of John Alan, the Lord Chancellor of Ireland, and this connection ultimately led to his downfall. He is best remembered as an ancestor of the 1st Duke of Wellington.

== Background ==
The Colley/Cowley family originated in Rutland, where they were long associated with the village of Glaston. Records show that Walter Cowley (born about 1489 & died 1548) moved to Ireland with his father Robert about 1505-06 as Judges & merchants from Rutlandshire. 1407 his 4 greats grandfather Walter was the Portreeve(Sheriff)of Kilkenny Ire. on 22 September 1511, the Mayor of Drogheda granted a case for Walter to find a Chaplin. In 1537 he was appointed Solicitor General of Ireland. Imprisoned in the Tower of London with his brother Robert Cowley an (Irish Judge). 1541-several letters were written to King Henry III pleading for clemency for him & his brother Robert which still exists. When released he was restored to Royal Favour, Surrendered his office to John Bathe in 1546, and later was Surveyor General in Ireland. He left a considerable fortune to his son Sir Henry who acquired & was the first to live in the Carbery Castle in 1554. Walter was Surveyor General in Kildare in 1550 & died possibly in Kildare Ireland. Walters's great-uncle was John Colley the 1st. Lord of Glaston, Rutlandshire, Eng. & brother to his great-grandfather Walter Cowley born 1440 in Glaston. When great-uncle John Colley the first Lord of Glaston died his oldest son Sir Anthony Colley who became a member of Parliament had 2 daughters & a son Anthony. Robert Cowley (judge), the son of Walter of Glaston later moved to Ireland about 1505–06, with his sons Walter & Robert (Jr) during King Henry VII's reign, and had a highly successful career as merchants etc. becoming Master of the Rolls in Ireland in 1536, but ultimately fell from power about 1540.

== Early career ==
By the mid-1530s Walter had developed political ambitions of his own; he and his father both became clients of Thomas Cromwell. This led to a clash with Patrick Barnewall, another client of Cromwell; Walter clearly hoped to replace Barnewall as Solicitor General for Ireland, and did replace him as Receiver of Customs for Drogheda. Both the Cowleys sought to blacken Barnewall's name, accusing him in particular of questioning the King's authority, a very serious matter given the ruthless fashion in which Henry VIII dealt with dissent. Barnewall was so alarmed that he offered to resign in Walter's favour; but Cromwell wished to retain the services of both men, and a separate office of Principal Solicitor for Ireland was created for Walter. Odd though this arrangement may seem, it probably helped to alleviate the burden of work for the two senior Law Officers, and continued for many years after Walter's removal.

Walter also clashed with James Bathe, Chief Baron of the Irish Exchequer 1540–1570; Walter's father had attacked Bathe as a "presumptuous upstart" as early as 1525. The Rebellion of Silken Thomas must have seemed an excellent opportunity to block Bathe's advancement, since his father-in-law John Burnell was one of the principal rebels. However, Bathe possessed both influential friends and the ability to avoid becoming tied to any political faction: his rise to power was a clear sign that the Cowleys' political influence was in decline.

== Later career ==
After Cromwell's downfall, Walter sought the patronage of the Lord Chancellor, John Alan, who belonged to a faction opposed to the Lord Deputy of Ireland, Sir Anthony St Leger. Since St Leger was notoriously hot-tempered his ensuing quarrel with St Leger was probably not of Walter's making, but he showed a serious lack of judgment, which led to his removal from office. His father was already out of favour and had been imprisoned in the Fleet Prison.

In an effort to conciliate James Butler, 9th Earl of Ormond, who had regained much of his family's former influence, St Leger gave him command of the Irish forces in the war against Scotland in 1544. Ormond received an anonymous letter at Gowran, accusing St Leger of deliberately exposing him to danger. It emerged that Walter had written the letter, although he insisted that an associate of his called Cantwell had been responsible.

In a further blunder, Walter and Lord Chancellor Alan drew up a book of articles, accusing St Leger of widespread maladministration. St Leger demanded an inquiry by the Privy Council of England, which exonerated him entirely. Walter was deprived of office and imprisoned in the Tower of London; the State papers preserve an abject letter he wrote to the King pleading for clemency and saying that he had acted out of genuine fear for Ormond's life. He was eventually released, and apparently regained a degree of favour, being appointed Surveyor-General shortly before he died in 1548. Since his family were able to purchase Carbury Castle, County Kildare, within a few years of his death, it is likely that he left a considerable fortune. A Memorial of Walter exists in Glaston, Rutlandshire Eng.

== Descendants ==
His wife's name was Lady Catherine "Anne" Cusack: he had two sons of whom the elder, Sir Henry Colley of Carbury Castle (died 1584), was a distinguished soldier and a direct ancestor of Richard Wesley, 1st Baron Mornington. Richard changed the family name to Wesley, and was the grandfather of the 1st Duke of Wellington.

== Character ==
Historians have little good to say of Walter Cowley: he and his father have been described as "ambitious mischief-makers". He should not perhaps be blamed for the abject tone of his letter to Henry VIII from the Tower of London pleading for mercy, since he may well have feared for his life at the time he wrote it. On the other hand, his intrigues against Barnewall and Bathe show him in an extremely unattractive light.
