= Duke of Wellington (title) =

Title in the Peerage of the United Kingdom

Dukedom of Wellington
- Quarterly 1st & 4th: Gules, a cross argent in each quarter five plates in saltire (Wellesley); 2nd & 3rd: Or, a lion rampant gules ducally collared gold (Colley) over-all in the centre chief point an escutcheon of augmentation charged with the Union badge
- Creation date: 3 May 1814
- Created by: The Prince Regent (acting on behalf of his father, King George III)
- Peerage: Peerage of the United Kingdom
- First holder: Arthur Wellesley, 1st Marquess of Wellington
- Present holder: Charles Wellesley, 9th Duke
- Heir apparent: Arthur Wellesley, Marquess of Douro
- Remainder to: the 1st Duke's heirs male of the body lawfully begotten
- Subsidiary titles: Prince of Waterloo; Duke of Ciudad Rodrigo; Duke of Victoria; Marquess of Wellington; Marquess of Douro; Marquess of Torres Vedras; Earl of Mornington; Earl of Wellington; Count of Vimeiro; Viscount Wellesley; Viscount Wellington; Baron Mornington; Baron Douro
- Seats: Stratfield Saye House; Apsley House
- Motto: Virtutis Fortuna Comes (Fortune favours the brave)

Duke of Wellington is a title in the Peerage of the United Kingdom. It was created in 1814 for Arthur Wellesley, 1st Marquess of Wellington (1769–1852), the Anglo-Irish military commander who is best known for defeating Napoleon at the Battle of Waterloo and serving twice as Prime Minister. In historical texts, unqualified use of the title typically refers to the 1st Duke. The title derives from Wellington in Somerset.

The first Duke's father, Garret Wesley, had been granted the title of Earl of Mornington in 1760. His male-line ancestors were wealthy agricultural and urban landowners in both countries, among the Anglo-Irish Protestant Ascendancy. The dukedom has descended to heirs male of the body, along with eleven other hereditary titles.

Five Dukes have been created Knights of the Garter, the most senior British order of knighthood.

== History ==
The titles of Duke of Wellington and Marquess of Douro were bestowed upon Arthur Wellesley, 1st Marquess of Wellington, on 3 May 1814 after he returned home a hero following Napoleon's abdication. He fought some sixty battles during his military career. He was considered "the conqueror of Napoleon". He stands as one of the finest soldiers that Great Britain and Ireland has ever produced, others being the 1st Duke of Marlborough and the 2nd Duke of Argyll.

Following his victory at the Battle of Talavera, Wellesley was offered a peerage. The question was what title should he take. His brother, Richard Wellesley, Earl of Mornington, looked around and discovered that a manor in the parish of Wellington, Somerset, was available. It was also reasonably close to the family name. Because Arthur was still in Spain in command of the army fighting the French, Richard oversaw the purchase. By this process Arthur therefore became Marquess of Wellington. According to the book Wellington as Military Commander by Michael Glover, Arthur Wellesley first signed himself 'Wellington' on 16 September 1809. At the Battle of Waterloo in 1815, Arthur Wellesley was already further elevated to the peerage rank of the Duke of Wellington. At the time he became Ambassador to France, The London Gazette of 4 June 1814 refers to him as having that title but suggests that it was granted by warrant on 25 August 1812.

=== Subsidiary titles ===
The subsidiary titles of the Duke of Wellington are Marquess of Wellington (1812), Marquess of Douro (1814), Earl of Mornington (1760 – but only inherited by the Dukes of Wellington in 1863), Earl of Wellington (1812), Viscount Wellesley (1760 – inherited in 1863), Viscount Wellington (1809), Baron Mornington (1746 – also inherited in 1863), and Baron Douro (1809). The Viscountcy of Wellesley and the Barony and Earldom of Mornington are in the Peerage of Ireland; the rest are in the Peerage of the United Kingdom.

=== European titles and honours ===
Apart from the British titles, the Dukes of Wellington also hold the titles of Prince of Waterloo (Prins van Waterloo, 1815) of the Kingdom of the Netherlands, Duke of Ciudad Rodrigo (Duque de Ciudad Rodrigo, 1812) of the Kingdom of Spain with Grandeeship, and Duke of Victoria (Duque da Vitória, 1812), with the subsidiary titles Marquess of Torres Vedras (Marquês de Torres Vedras, 1812) and Count of Vimeiro (Conde de Vimeiro, 1811) of the Kingdom of Portugal. These were granted to the first Duke as victory titles for his distinguished service as victorious commanding general in the Peninsular War (in Spain and Portugal) and at the Battle of Waterloo (in what is now Belgium).

== Estates and residences ==
=== Country seats ===
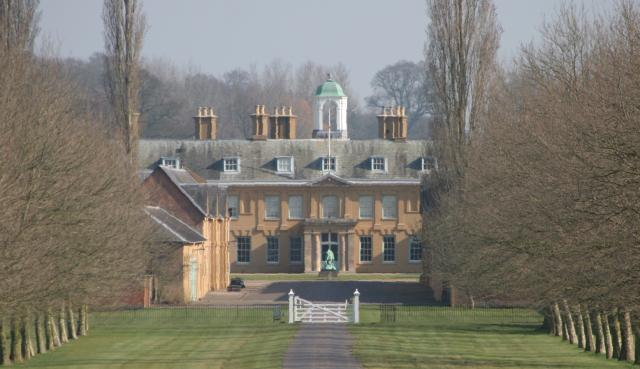
Stratfield Saye House in Hampshire, the principal country seat of the Dukes of Wellington since 1817

The family seat is Stratfield Saye House, near Basingstoke in Hampshire, which has been the principal country residence of the Dukes of Wellington since 1817. Following the creation of the dukedom in 1814, Parliament authorised the Treasury to advance up to £400,000 for the purchase of landed property to be settled upon Arthur Wellesley, 1st Duke of Wellington and his successors in order to support the dignity of the dukedom. Following Wellington's victory at the Battle of Waterloo in 1815, Parliament voted a further £200,000 to the trustees of the settlement for the purchase of a suitable residence and estate for the Duke and his heirs, bringing the parliamentary provision for this purpose to £600,000.

The estate ultimately selected was Stratfield Saye, then belonging to George Pitt, 2nd Baron Rivers, whose family had owned the property since the 17th century. Wellington first inspected the estate in September 1817 and approved its purchase, being attracted by its parkland, the River Loddon running through the property, and its relative proximity to London and Windsor. The house itself had been substantially developed by the Pitt family from the 17th century onwards and is now a Grade I listed building.

The original intention was to demolish the existing house and replace it with a much grander ducal residence, generally known as the proposed "Waterloo Palace". Designs were prepared by architects including Benjamin Dean Wyatt and Charles Robert Cockerell, but the scheme was abandoned and Wellington instead retained and enlarged the existing house. The Wellington Estate records that the Duke was satisfied with the existing residence, as were his wife and children, and decided against construction of the proposed palace. During the 1st Duke's ownership additions were made to both the house and estate, including new outer wings and a conservatory; the present entrance porch and conservatory date from 1838 and are attributed to Benjamin Dean Wyatt. Stratfield Saye has remained in the possession of the Wellington family and continues to serve as the country seat of the dukedom.

=== Estates ===
In the 1883 edition of John Bateman's The Great Landowners of Great Britain and Ireland, Arthur Wellesley, 2nd Duke of Wellington's estates were recorded as spanning 19,116 acres across England, including 15,847 acres in Hampshire, 2,246 acres in Hertfordshire, 529 acres in Somerset, and 494 acres in Berkshire, which produced a combined annual income of £22,162.

Below the Duke of Wellington's entry in Bateman's Great Landowners, the Duke of Wellington's own assessment of these figures is included: "Very incorrect."

The 1st Duke was also granted a large estate outside Granada, Spain by King Ferdinand VII as a reward for the Duke's services during the Peninsular War.

=== London residences ===
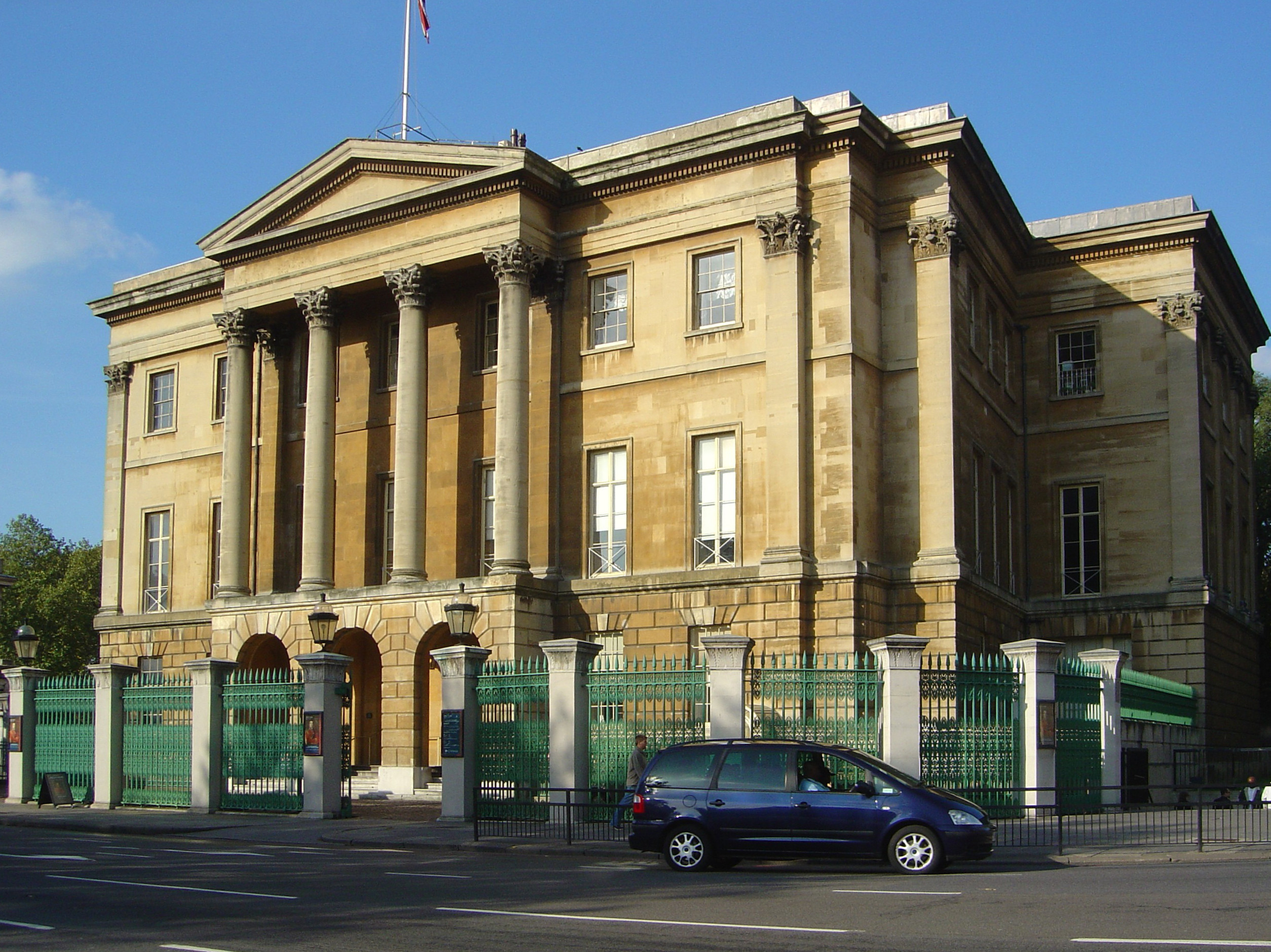
Apsley House at Hyde Park Corner, the London residence of the Dukes of Wellington since 1817

Apsley House, at Hyde Park Corner in London, has been the principal London residence of the Dukes of Wellington since 1817. The house was originally built in red brick between 1771 and 1778 by Robert Adam for Henry Bathurst, Lord Apsley, then Lord Chancellor, from whom it takes its name. Its position immediately inside the former toll gates at Knightsbridge led to its traditional designation as "Number One, London", as it was the first substantial house encountered by travellers entering London from the west. The house was purchased in 1807 by Richard Wellesley, 1st Marquess Wellesley, elder brother of the 1st Duke of Wellington. Financial difficulties subsequently obliged Wellesley to sell it in 1817 to his younger brother, Arthur Wellesley, 1st Duke of Wellington, who required a London residence for his developing political career.

The 1st Duke substantially enlarged and remodelled Apsley House under the architect Benjamin Dean Wyatt. In the first phase, begun in 1819, Wyatt constructed a three-storey extension to the north-east containing the State Dining Room, bedrooms and dressing rooms. A second phase, begun after Wellington became Prime Minister in 1828, created a new staircase and the Waterloo Gallery, while the original red-brick exterior was faced in Bath stone and a monumental portico was added. The Waterloo Gallery subsequently became the setting for the Duke's annual Waterloo Banquets commemorating the Battle of Waterloo, and the house accommodated the extensive collection of paintings, diplomatic gifts and other works of art assembled by the Duke. Apsley House, officially numbered 149 Piccadilly, is a Grade I listed building.

In 1947 Gerald Wellesley, 7th Duke of Wellington, transferred Apsley House and many of its most important contents to the nation. Under the Wellington Museum Act 1947, ownership of the house passed to the Crown, with the building to be used partly as a museum devoted to the 1st Duke and partly as a continuing private residence for successive Dukes of Wellington. Following refurbishment by the Ministry of Works, the public portion of the house opened as the Wellington Museum in 1952 under the administration of the Victoria and Albert Museum; responsibility for the museum was transferred to English Heritage in 2004.

The private apartment which continues to be occupied by the Wellesley family is situated within the northern half of the ground floor of Apsley House. Much of this accommodation corresponds with rooms which had originally formed the private apartments of the 1st Duke. The statutory right to retain a private residence within Apsley House continues for as long as the dukedom of Wellington remains extant.

== Dukes of Wellington (1814) ==
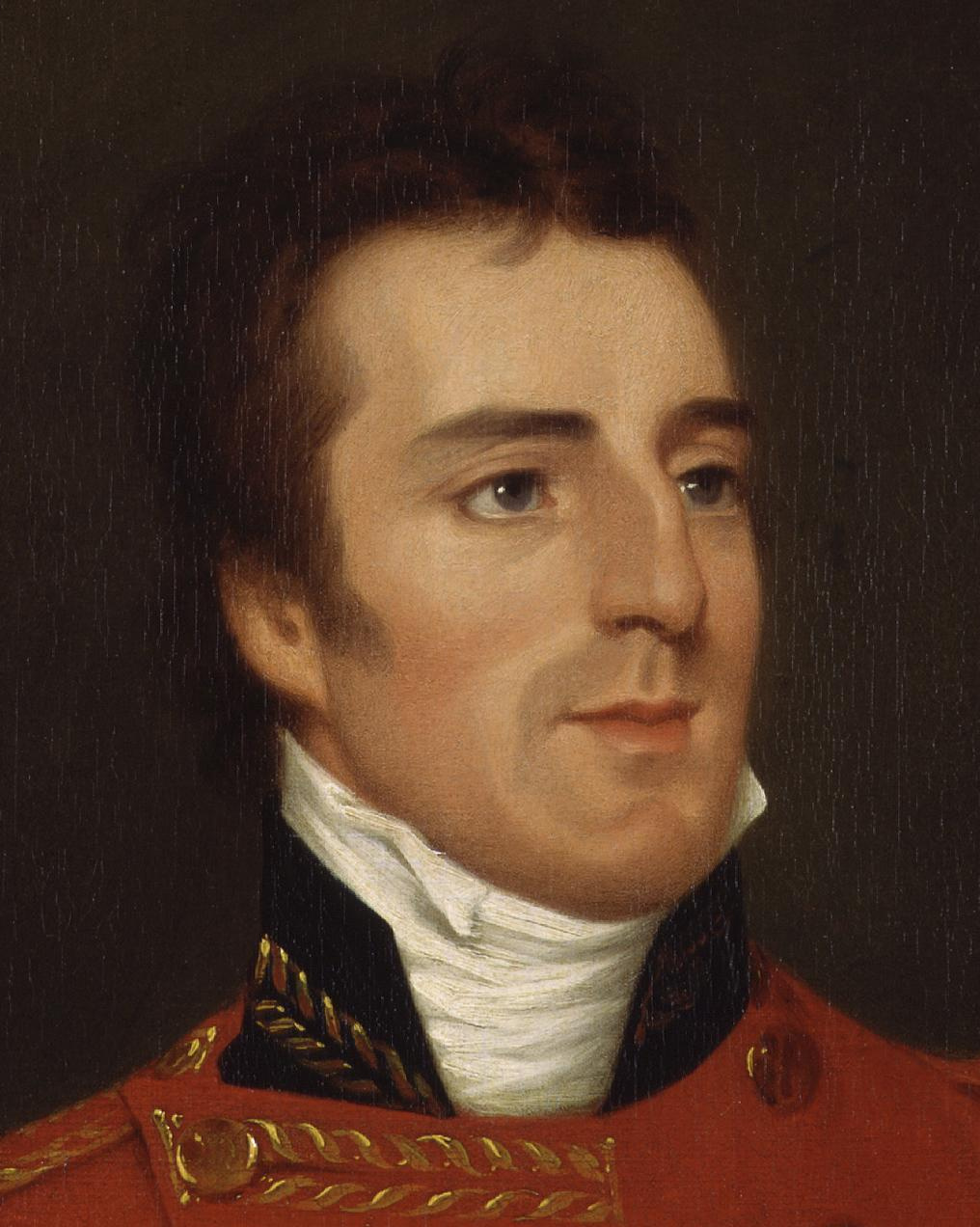
1st Duke of Wellington

Created by the Prince Regent (on behalf of George III)
#	Name	Period	Duchess	Notes	Other titles
1	Arthur Wellesley (born Wesley) (1769–1852)	1814–1852	The Hon. Catherine Pakenham	British Army officer and statesman who defeated Napoleon I at Waterloo and Tipu Sultan at the Siege of Seringapatam (1799)	Prince of Waterloo, Duke of Ciudad Rodrigo, Duke of Victoria, Marquess of Wellington, Marquess of Douro, Marquess of Torres Vedras, Earl of Wellington, Count of Vimeiro, Viscount Wellington, Baron Douro
2	Arthur Richard Wellesley (1807–1884)	1852–1884	Lady Elizabeth Hay	Son of the preceding	Prince of Waterloo, Duke of Ciudad Rodrigo, Duke of Victoria, Marquess of Wellington, Marquess of Douro, Marquess of Torres Vedras, Count of Vimeiro, Earl of Wellington; Earl of Mornington, Viscount Wellesley, Viscount Wellington, Baron Douro, Baron Mornington
3	Henry Wellesley (1846–1900)	1884–1900	Evelyn Williams	Nephew of the preceding	Prince of Waterloo, Duke of Ciudad Rodrigo, Duke of Victoria, Marquess of Wellington, Marquess of Douro, Marquess of Torres Vedras, Count of Vimeiro, Earl of Wellington; Earl of Mornington, Viscount Wellesley, Viscount Wellington, Baron Douro, Baron Mornington
4	Arthur Charles Wellesley (1849–1934)	1900–1934	Kathleen Williams	Brother of the preceding	Prince of Waterloo, Duke of Ciudad Rodrigo, Duke of Victoria, Marquess of Wellington, Marquess of Douro, Marquess of Torres Vedras, Count of Vimeiro, Earl of Wellington; Earl of Mornington, Viscount Wellesley, Viscount Wellington, Baron Douro, Baron Mornington
5	Arthur Charles Wellesley (1876–1941)	1934–1941	Hon. Lilian Coats	Son of the preceding	Prince of Waterloo, Duke of Ciudad Rodrigo, Duke of Victoria, Marquess of Wellington, Marquess of Douro, Marquess of Torres Vedras, Count of Vimeiro, Earl of Wellington; Earl of Mornington, Viscount Wellesley, Viscount Wellington, Baron Douro, Baron Mornington
6	Henry Valerian George Wellesley (1912–1943)	1941–1943	unmarried	Son of the preceding	Prince of Waterloo, Duke of Ciudad Rodrigo, Duke of Victoria, Marquess of Wellington, Marquess of Douro, Marquess of Torres Vedras, Count of Vimeiro, Earl of Wellington; Earl of Mornington, Viscount Wellesley, Viscount Wellington, Baron Douro, Baron Mornington
7	Gerald Wellesley (1885–1972)	1943–1972	Dorothy Ashton	Uncle of the preceding	Prince of Waterloo, Duke of Ciudad Rodrigo, Duke of Victoria, Marquess of Wellington, Marquess of Douro, Marquess of Torres Vedras, Count of Vimeiro, Earl of Wellington; Earl of Mornington, Viscount Wellesley, Viscount Wellington, Baron Douro, Baron Mornington
8	Arthur Valerian Wellesley (1915–2014)	1972–2014	Diana McConnel	Son of the preceding	Prince of Waterloo, Duke of Ciudad Rodrigo, Duke of Victoria, Marquess of Wellington, Marquess of Douro, Marquess of Torres Vedras, Count of Vimeiro, Earl of Wellington; Earl of Mornington, Viscount Wellesley, Viscount Wellington, Baron Douro, Baron Mornington
9	Arthur Charles Valerian Wellesley (born 1945)	2014–present	Princess Antonia of Prussia	Son of the preceding	Prince of Waterloo, Duke of Ciudad Rodrigo, Duke of Victoria, Marquess of Wellington, Marquess of Douro, Marquess of Torres Vedras, Count of Vimeiro, Earl of Wellington; Earl of Mornington, Viscount Wellesley, Viscount Wellington, Baron Douro, Baron Mornington; Baron Wellington of Stratfield Saye

== Line of succession ==
- Arthur Wellesley, 4th Duke of Wellington (1849–1934)
  - Arthur Wellesley, 5th Duke of Wellington (1876–1941)
    - Henry Wellesley, 6th Duke of Wellington (1912–1943)
  - Gerald Wellesley, 7th Duke of Wellington (1885–1972)
    - Valerian Wellesley, 8th Duke of Wellington (1915–2014)
      - Charles Wellesley, 9th Duke of Wellington (b. 1945)
        - (1) Arthur Wellesley, Marquess of Douro (b. 1978)
          - (2) Arthur Wellesley, Earl of Mornington (b. 2010)
          - (3) Lord Alfred Wellesley (b. 2014)
          - (4) Lord Arlo Wellesley (b. 2023)
        - (5) Lord Frederick Wellesley (b. 1992)
          - (6) Finneas Fritz Wellesley (b. 2023)
      - (7) Lord Richard Wellesley (b. 1949)
      - (8) Lord John Wellesley (b. 1954)
        - (9) Gerald Wellesley (b. 1981)
      - (10) Lord James Wellesley (b. 1956)
        - (11) Oliver Wellesley (b. 2005)
  - Lord George Wellesley (1889–1967)
    - Richard Wellesley (1920–1984)
      - John Wellesley (1962–2009)
        - male issue in remainder

Should the direct male line of succession from the first Duke of Wellington become extinct, the dukedom and its subsidiary titles in the British peerage will become extinct, as will the titles of Prince of Waterloo in the Dutch peerage and the dukedom of the Victory and its subsidiary titles in the Portuguese peerage.

The dukedom of Ciudad Rodrigo in the Spanish peerage, together with its subsidiary titles, will continue to be held in the female line of descendants of the first Duke. The earldom and barony of Mornington, along with the viscountcy of Wellesley, which are all titles in the Irish peerage, will revert to the line of the Earl Cowley, a male-line descendant of a younger brother of the first Duke of Wellington.

Wellesley family tree: Dukes of Wellington, Victoria, and Ciudad Rodrigo, and Princes of Waterloo

Baron Mornington of Mornington, 1746
Richard Colley Wesley; 1690–1758; 1st Baron Mornington
Earl of Mornington and Viscount Wellesley, of Dangan Castle in the County of Meath, 1760
Richard Colley Wesley; 1735–1781; 1st Earl of Mornington, etc., 2nd Baron Mornington
Baron Wellesley of Wellesley in the County of Somerset, 1797; Marquess Wellesley of Norragh, 1799	Baron Maryborough of Maryborough in the Queen's County, 1821	Viscount Wellington (UK), 1809; Count of Vimeiro (Portugal), 1811; Marquess of Wellington (UK), 1812; Duke of Ciudad Rodrigo (Spain), 1812; Duke of Victoria and Marquess of Torres Vedras (Portugal), 1812; Duke of Wellington (UK) and Marquess Douro and Baron Douro (Portugal), 1814; Prince of Waterloo (Netherlands), 1815
Richard Wellesley; 1760–1842; Marquess Wellesley, etc., 2nd Earl of Mornington, etc., 3rd Baron Mornington	William Wellesley-Pole; 1763–1845; 3rd Earl of Mornington, etc., 4th Baron Mornington, 1st Baron Maryborough	Arthur Wellesley; 1769–1852; 1st Duke of Wellington, etc.
Marquessate Wellesley and Barony Wellesley extinct, 1842
William Pole-Tylney-Long-Wellesley; 1788–1857; 4th Earl of Mornington, etc., 5th Baron Mornington, 2nd Baron Maryborough	Arthur Richard Wellesley; 1807–1884; 2nd Duke of Wellington, etc., 6th Earl of Mornington, etc.	Lord Charles Wellesley; 1808–1858
William Pole-Tylney-Long-Wellesley; 1813–1863; 5th Earl of Mornington, etc., 6th Baron Mornington, 3rd Baron Maryborough	Henry Wellesley; 1846–1900; 3rd Duke of Wellington, etc., 7th Earl of Mornington, etc.	Arthur Charles Wellesley; 1849–1934; 4th Duke of Wellington, etc., 8th Earl of Mornington, etc.
Barony Maryborough extinct, 1863
Arthur Charles Wellesley; 1876–1941; 5th Duke of Wellington, etc., 9th Earl of Mornington, etc.	Gerald Wellesley; 1885–1972; 7th Duke of Wellington, etc., 8th Duke of Ciudad Rodrigo, 10th Earl of Mornington, etc.
Anne Rhys; 1910–1998; 7th Duchess of Ciudad Rodrigo	Henry Valerian George Wellesley; 1912–1943; 6th Duke of Wellington, etc., 11th Earl of Mornington, etc.	Arthur Valerian Wellesley; 1915–2014; 8th Duke of Wellington, etc., 9th Duke of Ciudad Rodrigo, 12th Earl of Mornington, etc.
Baron Wellington of Stratfield Saye, 2026
Arthur Charles Valerian Wellesley b. 1945; 9th Duke of Wellington, etc., 10th Duke of Ciudad Rodrigo, 13th Earl of Mornington, etc., Baron Wellington of Stratfield Saye
Arthur Gerald Wellesley styled Marquess of Douro b. 1978
Arthur Darcy Wellesley b. 2010 styled Earl of Mornington

The Colley or Cowley family had come to Ireland from Glaston, in Rutland about 1500; Sir Henry Colley was elevated to the Peerage as Lord Glaston by Henry VIII. He married the daughter of Thomas Cusack, Lord Chancellor of Ireland, Catherine Wellesley Cusack (d. 1598) whose grandmother was a Wellesley. Upon the death of his cousin Garret Wesley and his inheritance of the Estates of Dangan and Mornington, Richard Colley (d. 1758) and his wife Elizabeth Sale (d. 17 June 1738) daughter of John Sale, Registrar of the Diocese of Dublin, on 23 December 1719. adopted the name Wellesley (from both Elizabeth's maternal family side from Catherine Wellesley Cusack her grandmother) and through her Husband's Family, his cousin, Garret Wesley (Wellesley).

== See also ==
- Duke of Ciudad Rodrigo
- Prins van Waterloo
- Duque da Vitória
- Waterloo ceremony
- Grandee of Spain
