= Robert Cowley (judge) =

English politicians (1470–1546)

Robert Cowley or Colley (c. 1470–1546) was an English-born judge in sixteenth-century Ireland who held the office of Master of the Rolls in Ireland. He is chiefly remembered as a possible ancestor of the 1st Duke of Wellington.

== Early life ==
Despite his family's later eminence, Robert's background is obscure and his early life is poorly recorded. He was the father of Walter Cowley of Glaston in Rutland; the Colley/Cowley family is recorded there from about 1400. In the pedigree presented by James Wright in his history of Rutland, the earliest recorded ancestor of the family is listed as "John Colly of Lubbenham" presumably hailing from Lubenham in Leicestershire. Robert is said to have seen military service with Garret Mor, the "Great" Earl of Kildare, but the first definite trace of him is when he entered Lincoln's Inn in 1502. He then decided on a business career abt 1505 with his sons Walter & Robert (Jr), and moved to Dublin where he became a successful merchant. He was made Bailiff of Dublin in 1515.

== Political and judicial career ==
From about 1520 Cowley played an increasing role in Irish politics. He was in the retinue of the Earl of Surrey when he was appointed Lord Lieutenant of Ireland. In 1522 when Piers Butler, 8th Earl of Ormond replaced Surrey as Lieutenant, Cowley became his legal adviser and Clerk to the Council in 1525; thereafter the Cowley family were regarded as strong Ormond partisans. Robert also sought to gain influence by becoming a regular correspondent of Cardinal Wolsey and later of Thomas Cromwell. His devices for Ireland in 1537 suggested to Cromwell that all "All Irish on this side Shannon to be prosecuted, subdued, and exiled;". James Bathe, later Chief Baron of the Irish Exchequer and a trusted Crown servant for thirty years, faced Cowley's hostility from early in his career. In 1525 Bathe, then a very young lawyer, presented the English Government with a book setting out his proposals for reform of the Irish administration: Cowley ridiculed it, writing to Wolsey that Bathe knew as much about the government of Ireland as Cowley did about that of Italy.

=== Feud with Patrick Barnewall ===
In the 1530s Robert and his brother Walter Cowley engaged in a power struggle with Patrick Barnewall, the Irish Solicitor General, who also had considerable influence with Cromwell. The Cowleys, who had the reputation for being entirely unscrupulous in advancing their careers, kept up a flow of letters to Cromwell attempting to undermine Barnewall. They alleged that Barnewall had challenged the King's authority in religious matters, a very serious charge in the political climate of the time. For a time it seemed the Cowleys would oust Barnewall: Cowley obtained the offices of Clerk of the Crown and Receiver of Customs of the port of Dublin, and Cromwell praised him as a man of long established fidelity and truth, an opinion with which few others, then or since, have ever agreed. Barnewall at one point offered to surrender the office of Solicitor General for Ireland to Walter Cowley. In the event Cromwell seems to have made peace between the rivals: Barnewall remained Solicitor General and a new post of Principal Solicitor for Ireland was created for Walter. Robert became Master of the Rolls in 1539. He served on the commission for suppression of the religious houses and received as his reward the priory of Holmpatrick, near Dublin.

== Last years ==
Cowley's influence declined after the downfall and death of Cromwell in 1540: Henry VIII distrusted him, and like many leading political figures of the Pale he quarrelled with Sir Anthony St. Leger, the Lord Deputy of Ireland. His efforts to block the rise to power of Chief Baron Bathe were entirely unsuccessful, even though he pointed out, correctly, that many of Bathe's friends and relatives had been deeply involved in the Rebellion of Silken Thomas. In 1541 Cowley unwisely went to London without official leave: he was promptly denounced for sedition, imprisoned in the Fleet Prison and deprived of office. He was released from the Fleet in 1543 and died in England three years later. His son Walter was also deprived of office and imprisoned in the Tower of London – several letters from him to the King pleading for clemency still exist.

== Character ==
Cowley was a gifted man who rose from obscurity to found one of the great Anglo-Irish families, but as a man, he was not highly regarded by his contemporaries, or by later historians. His letters to Cromwell, particularly those which detail his efforts to destroy Patrick Barnewall, show him in an unattractive light, and historians have described both Robert and Walter as "ambitious mischief-makers".

== Descendants ==
Although Walter Cowley, Principal Solicitor for Ireland, is recorded as Robert's brother he was in fact Robert's son. Records show that two Walter and Robert Colley originated from Glaston in Rutland, England, and that Walter's son was the distinguished soldier Sir Henry Colley of Carbury Castle. Henry was an ancestor of Richard Colley, who adopted the surname Wesley, was created Baron Mornington and was grandfather of the 1st Duke of Wellington.
