= Burnell family =

Dublin family

The Burnell family were a Dublin family who were prominent in Irish public life and in the arts from the thirteenth to the seventeenth century. They acquired substantial estates in County Dublin, and married into the Anglo-Irish aristocracy. They produced several judges and politicians, a leading playwright, and one of the first female Irish poets. They were staunch Roman Catholics, who opposed the Penal Laws, and supported the Irish Confederacy in the 1640s. They forfeited most of their lands after the failure of the Confederate cause, and never recovered them.

== Family History ==
It is unclear when the Burnells arrived in Ireland: there are several English families of the same name. The Burnell family who lived in London in the sixteenth century were related to the Irish Burnells: Richard Burnell, lawyer and MP for the City of London in the English Parliament of 1554, who died in 1558, left a legacy to his Irish cousin, John Bathe, whose mother was a Burnell of Balgriffin. From the will of Richard's brother Thomas, it seems that the London Burnells were quite a numerous clan.

In 1284 Edward I, Lord of Ireland, granted to William Burnell lands at Glencapy (present-day Rathdown), and other lands in County Wicklow, including Glaslawer, together with the right to take timber from the woods in the King's manor at Ballyconyn. William was Constable of Dublin Castle in 1284 and again in 1291–92. Philip Burnell is recorded as living in County Meath in 1306, when he was one of the defendants in a case of serious assault brought by four members of the Netterville family (who later became one of the most prominent landowning families in Meath) and was ordered to pay heavy damages. A Robert Burnell was Lord Mayor of Dublin in 1356–7, and the same or another Robert Burnell was Lord Mayor of Dublin in 1383–4. Robert Burnell in 1366 held the manor of Balrothery near Finglas. A much later Sir Robert Burnell was Mayor of Dublin three times in the 1450s and 60s. In 1462 he was granted £20 a year to repair the city walls (normally a special tax called the murage, was levied for this purpose).

The early Burnell of whom most is known is Robert, who was Lord of the Manor of Balgriffin in c.1388. He may well have been the son of the Robert Burnell whose widow Margaret married Richard Plunkett, Lord Chancellor of Ireland (died 1393), and may also have been the Robert Burnell who was Mayor of Dublin a few years earlier. A royal writ survives from 1381 ordering him to grant to John Cruys (this was Sir John Cruys or Cruise of Booterstown and Mount Merrion, a prominent soldier and diplomat, who died in 1407) a two-thirds share in a watermill called Luttrell's Mill in County Dublin. Robert married Matilda Tyrrell, heiress to the Irish feudal barony of Castleknock. The manor of Castleknock later became the principal Burnell residence. He was a Baron of the Court of Exchequer (Ireland) and thus began a long family tradition of serving as members of the Irish judiciary, particularly on the Exchequer. His son John was living in 1421. John in turn had a son named Robert. In 1447 Robert received a royal pardon for "intruding" at Balgriffin i.e. asserting his ownership of the estate without the required royal licence. His father had presumably died shortly before.

A later John Burnell was Chief Baron of the Irish Exchequer in the 1490s and another Burnell, Patrick, who died in 1491, was also a Baron of the Exchequer.

In about 1490 Sir Robert Burnell was Lord of the Manor of Balgriffin: he married Margaret Holywood, daughter and co-heiress of Sir Robert Holywood of Artane (Tartaine was the older spelling), who brought him substantial lands at Swords, north of Dublin. Their daughter Anne married William Preston, 2nd Viscount Gormanston.

John Burnell of Castleknock took part in the Rebellion of Silken Thomas and was executed for treason at Tyburn in 1537; but his cousin, yet another John, managed to retain the family estates at Balgriffin, which later passed by inheritance to the Bathe family.

== The Last Generations ==
In the second half of the sixteenth century Henry Burnell, son of the fourth John Burnell, was one of Ireland's foremost barristers, and served briefly as Recorder of Dublin and a judge of the Court of King's Bench (Ireland). He also sat in the Irish House of Commons as MP for County Dublin in the Irish Parliament of 1585, where he was a passionate advocate for the rights of Roman Catholics, and he was frequently in trouble with the English Crown as a result.

His grandson, also named Henry, was a well-known playwright: his play Landgartha (1640) was one of the first Irish plays to be published and the last play performed in Werburgh Street Theatre, Dublin's first theatre, which closed shortly afterwards. He was wealthy and influential enough to marry Lady Frances Dillon, a daughter of James Dillon, 1st Earl of Roscommon. Of his nine children, his daughter Eleanor is still remembered as one of the few Irish women poets of her time, although not much is known of her personal life, and only a few of her poems, all of which were written in Latin, survive.

In the 1640s Henry became a leading member of the Irish Confederacy. Though little is recorded of his later years, it is known that most of the Burnell estates were forfeited for rebellion, while he himself was sentenced to transportation to Connaught, although he managed to obtain a stay on the sentence on the ground of ill health.

Through the marriage of Alice Burnell, a sister of Henry Burnell (the Elizabethan judge), to Richard Talbot of Templeogue, judge of the Court of Common Pleas (Ireland), in about 1550, the Burnells were ancestors of Sir Henry Talbot, founder of the prominent Talbot family of Mount Talbot.

== Notable family members ==
- Robert Burnell (fl.1388), Lord of the Manor of Balgriffin and Baron of the Irish Exchequer; possibly the same Robert Burnell who was Mayor of Dublin 1383–4
- Sir Robert Burnell, three times Mayor of Dublin between 1454 and 1462
- John Burnell (died c.1492), Chief Baron of the Irish Exchequer and Escheator for County Dublin
- Patrick Burnell (died 1491), Baron of the Court of Exchequer (Ireland)
- Sir Henry Burnell (fl. 1500), Lord of the Manor of Balgriffin, married the Holywood heiress of Artane Castle
- John Burnell (died 1537), executed at Tyburn for rebellion
- Henry Burnell (c.1540-1614), Recorder of Dublin
- Henry Burnell, grandson of the previous (died c.1656), playwright and politician
- Eleanor Burnell (fl.1640), daughter of Henry the playwright, one of the first Irish women poets
- Philip Burnell (fl.2009), son of David the sheriff, one of the most prolific gaming YouTubers

== Places associated with Burnell family ==
- Artane
- Balgriffin
- Castleknock

== Notable works ==
- Landgartha, a tragicomedy, a play by Henry Burnell (1640)
- Patri suo Charissimo operis Encomium, a poem by Eleanor Burnell, daughter of the playwright Henry Burnell (1640s?).
