= John Talbot (Jacobite) =

Irish landowner, politician and soldier

John Talbot was an Irish landowner, politician and soldier of the seventeenth century. He played an active role in both the War of the Three Kingdoms and the Williamite War in Ireland.

He was from Belgard (now within South Dublin), and hailed from a long-established Old English family of The Pale. A Roman Catholic, he took part in the Irish Rebellion of 1641 and subsequently served in the forces of the Irish Confederates. Because of his later support for Crown forces, particularly during the Cromwellian conquest of Ireland, he was restored to half his estate when Charles II came to the throne.

During the reign of the Catholic James II a major purge of Protestant office-holders was undertaken. He was appointed as Lord Lieutenant of County Wicklow and raised a cavalry regiment to serve in the Irish Army. He sat as a member for Newcastle in the 1689 Patriot Parliament. He led his regiment at the Battle of the Boyne and the Battle of Aughrim. The terms of the Treaty of Limerick in 1691 allowed him to retain his estates, and he retired there rather than emigrating in the Flight of the Wild Geese as many of his comrades did.

He married a daughter of Sir Henry Talbot, a fellow County Dublin landowner. Their only daughter Catherine married Thomas Dillon of Brackloon, a grandson of Theobald Dillon, 1st Viscount Dillon.

== Bibliography ==
- D'Alton, John. King James's Irish Army List. The Celtic Bookshop, 1997.
