= St Andrew's Church, Glaston =

Church in Glaston, Rutland

Coordinates: 52°35′44″N 0°40′41″W

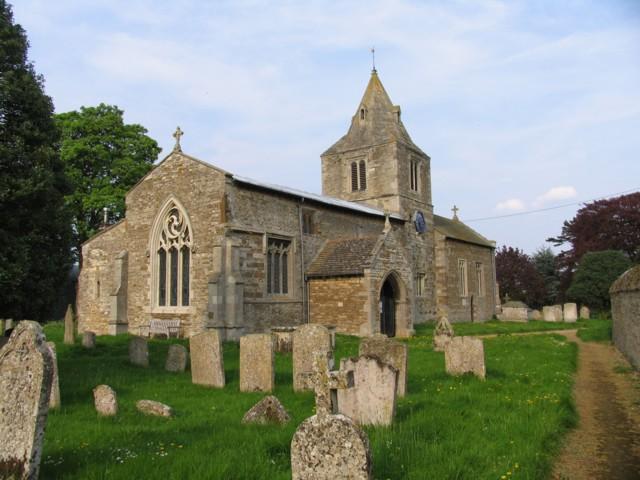
- Denomination: Church of England

History
- Dedication: St Andrew

Administration
- Diocese: Peterborough
- Parish: Glaston, Rutland

Clergy
- Vicar(s): Jane Baxter

St Andrew's Church is the Church of England parish church in Glaston, Rutland. It is a Grade II* listed building.

== History ==
The earliest parts of the church date from the 12th century and originally had a chancel, nave and a central tower. The northern aisle was built c1200. In c1220 the top of the tower and the spire were built. The building started being rebuilt to its current form in 1340. Work stopped because of the Black Death. The porch was built in 1622, it was later rebuilt for a second time in 1880. A singing gallery was added at the western end of the nave in 1699. Restoration of the chancel took place in 1863 and of the nave in 1864.

The church has six bells the earliest dating to 1598 and the newest two dating from 1931.

There is a 14th-century triple sedilia. A mural to numerous of the lords of the manor between 1650 and 1761 is in the nave. In the chancel there is a coffin lid dating from the 14th century.

4 Parachute Squadron, Royal Engineers were billeted in Glaston and at Bisbrooke Hall in the months before Operation Market Garden in September 1944. A memorial in the parish church records 19 names.

St Andrew's suffered from heritage crime in 2018 and wasplaced on the Heritage at Risk Register. Repair works began in Autumn 2021.

== Incumbents ==
In 1663 the advowson was given to Peterhouse, Cambridge by Bernard Hale, the Master of the college. Masters of Peterhouse were Rector of Glaston until 1867, when the rectory was detached from the headship by new college statutes.

- John Whalley (Master of Peterhouse)
- William Hodgson (Master of Peterhouse)
- Henry Wilkinson Cookson (Master of Peterhouse)
- Christopher Wordsworth
- Walter Whittingham
