= Henry Colley (died 1723) =

Henry Colley (circa 1685 – 1723/10 February 1724) was an Irish Member of Parliament. He was a member of the same family as the Duke of Wellington.

== Biography ==
Colley was the son of Henry Colley (died 1719) and Mary, daughter of Sir William Ussher. (Note: Colley's father and younger brother, Richard Wesley, 1st Baron Mornington were also Irish MPs.'"`UNIQ--ref-00000004-QINU`"')

Colley represented Strabane in the Irish House of Commons from 1723 to his death.

== Family ==
In 1719 Colley married Mary, daughter of James Hamilton, 6th Earl of Abercorn and Hon. Elizabeth Reading. They had a daughter:

- Mary (11 July 1723 – 7 April 1794), who married Arthur Pomeroy, 1st Viscount Harberton by whom she had seven children.

His estates passed to his brother Richard Wesley, 1st Baron Mornington, who changed the family name to Wesley on inheriting the estates of his cousin Garret Wesley. He was the grandfather of the 1st Duke of Wellington. Later generations changed the spelling of the family name to Wellesley, on the basis of their descent from the fifteenth century heiress Alison de Wellesley, who was the mother of Sir Thomas Cusack, (died 1571), Lord Chancellor of Ireland.
