= Patrick Burnell =

Irish judge and Crown official

Patrick Burnell (died 1491) was an Irish judge and Crown official of the fifteenth century.

== Biography ==
He was a member of the prominent Burnell family, who were Lords of the Manor of Balgriffin in County Dublin for several generations, and produced several distinguished judges; in Patrick's own generation, his cousin John Burnell was briefly Chief Baron of the Irish Exchequer.

He is first heard of in 1467, when he was serving as a clerk in the Exchequer of Ireland; in 1477 he was giving evidence to the English Court of Chancery. In 1478 he was appointed third Baron of the Court of Exchequer (Ireland), following the death of Nicholas Sutton, whose widow, Anne Cusacke, Burnell later married. He was made Chief Chamberlain as well as a Baron of the Exchequer in 1484, and owned several properties in Dublin, including houses in Fishamble Street.

== The pretender's claim ==
In common with almost all of the Irish judges of the time he was a client of Gerald FitzGerald, 8th Earl of Kildare, who was for many years the dominant force in Irish political life. Like his judicial colleagues, he meekly agreed, at Kildare's insistence, to support the claim of the pretender Lambert Simnel to be the rightful King of England in 1487: Kildare had Simnel crowned in Dublin and he invaded England with an Irish army.

When Simnel's cause was crushed at the Battle of Stoke Field, the victorious King Henry VII showed remarkable clemency to the rebels (including Simnel himself, who became a servant in the Royal household), and Burnell benefitted from the general royal pardon issued in 1488. He died in 1491.
