= Richard Talbot (Irish judge) =

Irish judge and landowner

Richard Talbot (c.1520–1577) was a sixteenth-century Irish judge and landowner. He is notable as the ancestor of the prominent Talbot family of Mount Talbot, Dublin, and for his lawsuit against Nicholas Nugent, the future Chief Justice of the Irish Common Pleas.

== Background ==
He was the eldest son of William Talbot, who was himself the youngest son of Thomas Talbot, Lord of Malahide and his second wife Elizabeth Bulkeley. William's brother Peter was the ancestor of the Barons Talbot. Richard's mother, like his wife, belonged to the Burnell family, who were Lords of the Manor of Balgriffin and Castleknock, and had a long tradition of judicial service.

Richard was Lord of the Manor of Templeogue by 1555. This meant that among his other duties, he was responsible for the upkeep, maintenance, and supply of pure water in the River Dodder, which flowed through his lands. The Dodder was for centuries the main supply of drinking water for Dublin: as regards control of the water supply, the owner of the property was answerable to Dublin Corporation.

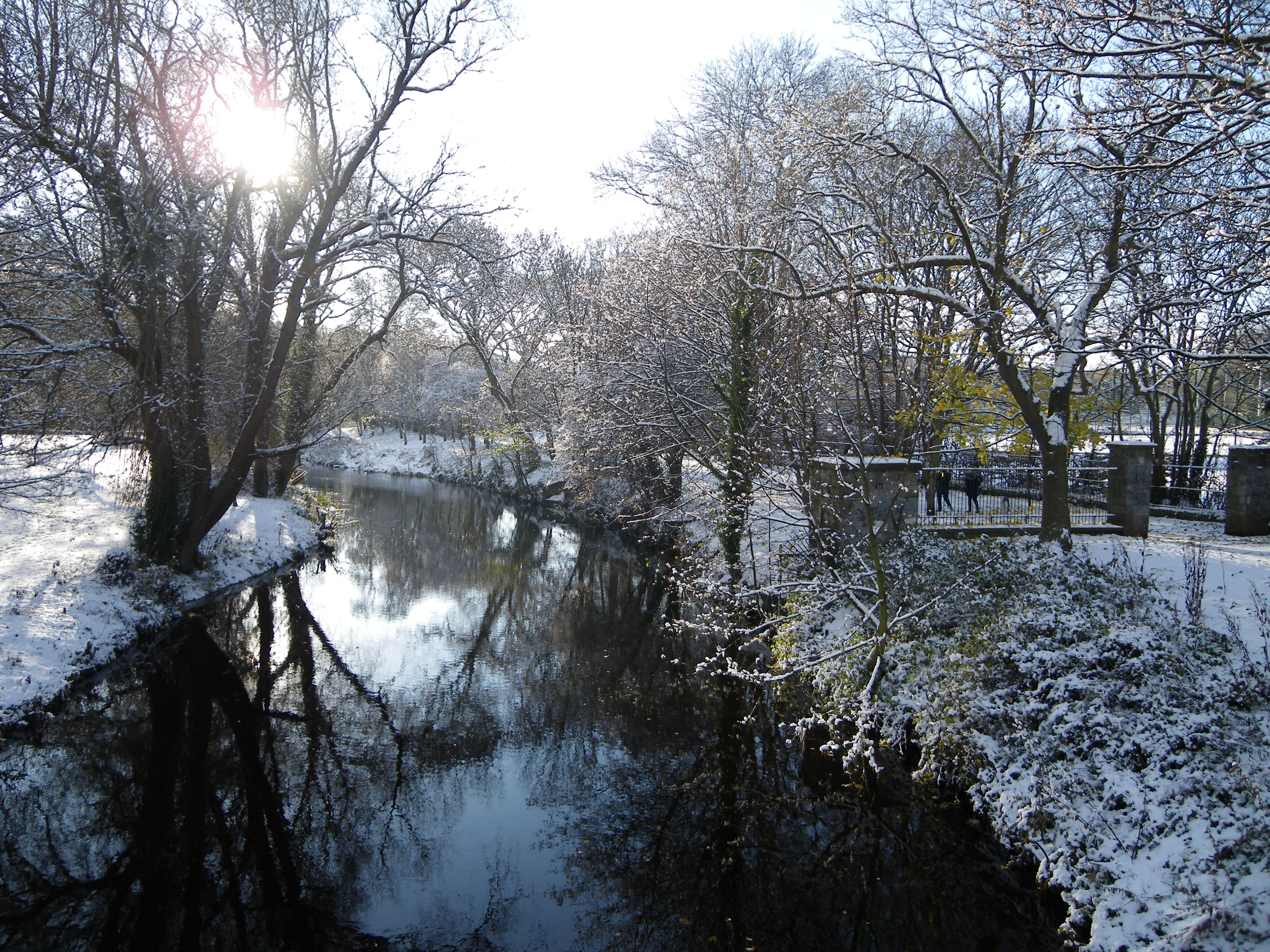
River Dodder at Rathgar, present day

== Judge ==
He was appointed justice of County Wexford in 1555 and second justice of the Court of Common Pleas (Ireland) in 1557 on the retirement of Walter Kerdiff.In 1560 Elizabeth imposed the Oath of Supremacy on her Irish office holders, requiring them to recognise her as Head of the Church of Ireland. Talbot made no difficulty about swearing the oath, despite the fact that his mother and wife both belonged to the Burnell family who were staunch Roman Catholics (even devout Catholics would take the Oath, though usually only under pressure). He was one of the lessees of the King's Inns in 1567.

== Clash with Nicholas Nugent ==
Talbot's judicial colleague Nicholas Nugent was a grandson of the fourth Baron Delvin: his family's influence, and the good opinion of some of his colleagues, secured for him high judicial office, first as a Baron of the Court of Exchequer (Ireland) and eventually Chief Justice of the Common Pleas. Nugent was a hot-tempered and quarrelsome man who had been notorious for brawling in his student days; his loyalty to the English Crown was deeply suspect, and he was eventually executed for treason, a unique fate for an Irish judge.

In 1576 Talbot sued Nugent for riot and unlawful assembly in the Court of Castle Chamber. That Court had been set up in 1571 as a mirror to the English Court of Star Chamber. Riot and judicial misconduct were two of its particular concerns, so that if it was satisfied that Nugent was guilty it might have been expected to impose a serious penalty. In the end, the case was dismissed in February 1577, apparently on the ground that one eye-witness was not sufficient in a matter of such gravity. It may be that Castle Chamber, which was generally regarded as being much less effective than its English counterpart, was reluctant to penalise men of such high social standing, whatever their alleged misdeeds. Talbot's reaction to the verdict is unknown; he died later the same year.

== Family ==
Talbot married his cousin Alice Burnell, daughter of John Burnell of Balgriffin, and sister of the prominent barrister and Catholic spokesman Henry Burnell. Their son John Talbot (died c. 1584) was the grandfather of Sir Henry Talbot, founder of the prominent Talbot family of Mount Talbot. They also had a daughter, who married her distant cousin, Gilbert Talbot of Belgard Castle. The Belgard branch of the family died out in 1697.
