= Thomas Talbot (died 1487) =

Thomas Talbot (1438 – 1487) was a wealthy landowner and judge in fifteenth-century Ireland. He was the head of the prominent Talbot family of Malahide Castle. His descendants acquired the title Baron Talbot de Malahide, and he himself was recognised by the Crown as Lord of Malahide, although this was not a hereditary title. He was also Admiral of the Port of Malahide. By the time of his death he held lands in four counties and was one of the principal landowners in the Pale. After his death, there was a lawsuit between his widow Elizabeth and a Talbot relative, James, over possession of some of his properties.

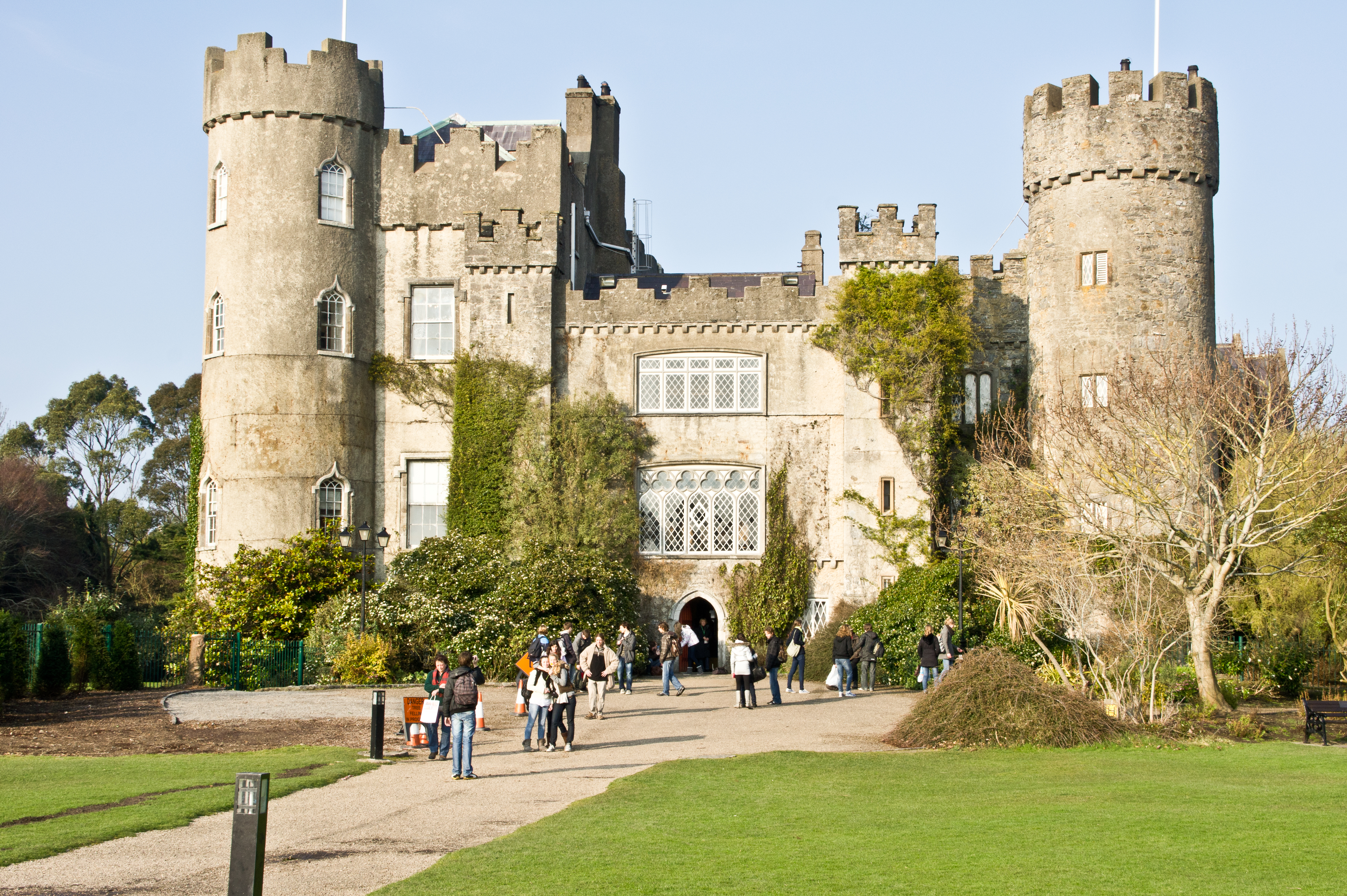
Malahide Castle, present day

== Early life ==
He was the son of Richard Talbot of Malahide Castle and Matilda (or Maud) Plunkett, daughter of Christopher Plunkett, first Baron Killeen and Janet Cusack. She was a much-married lady, whose other husbands were Jenico d'Artois the younger, and then Thomas Hussey, 5th Baron Galtrim, who was murdered on their wedding day, an event which inspired the nineteenth-century ballad "The Bride of Malahide". Richard Talbot had inherited Malahide in 1432 when he was still a minor and died in 1442. Thomas was given possession of his lands in 1459 on foot of a petition to the Privy Council of Ireland which stated that he had proved that he had come of age, and thus we know that he was born in 1438. His mother obtained letters patent from the English Crown granting her possession of her late husband's estates.

In about 1460 his mother made a fourth marriage to Sir John Cornwalsh, Chief Baron of the Irish Exchequer. The marriage was reputed to be a stormy one: Cornwalsh was notoriously quarrelsome, and Matilda is said to have been fully a match for him in temper. He built Dardistown Castle in County Meath, with the aid of a grant from the Crown for the construction of defensible houses. Cornwalsh died in 1472, and Matilda died in 1482. Since Cornwalsh had no children, Thomas inherited the Cornwalsh estates, which were principally situated in County Meath; he also acquired lands in County Louth from the heirs of Baron Darcy de Knayth.

== Career ==
In 1460 King Henry VI, by letters patent, recognised Thomas as Dominus (Lord) of Malahide. In 1472 he became a judge of the Court of Common Pleas (Ireland). In 1475 King Edward IV created him Admiral of the Port of Malahide, with power to hold an Admiralty court, and the right to levy customs duties on all merchandise coming through the port, as well as a number of other privileges, including an exemption from doing homage for his lands. These privileges suggest that Thomas was a man for whose support the House of York was willing to pay a high price. This was part of a wider Yorkist policy, which had considerable success, of trying to win the support of powerful Anglo-Irish magnates such as the Earl of Kildare. Many of these men remained Yorkist in sympathy even after the downfall of the Yorkist dynasty in 1485, and most of them made the mistake of supporting the Yorkist pretender Lambert Simnel, who unsuccessfully claimed the Crown of England in 1487. It is unclear whether or not Talbot belonged to the Simnel faction, since he died in July of that year, at the height of the crisis.

== Death and descendants ==
Thomas died on 23 July 1487. His first wife was a Miss Somerton, but little is known of her except the name. By his second wife Elizabeth Bulkeley, he had five sons:

- Peter (his heir), ancestor of the Barons Talbot
- John, ancestor of the Talbots of Dardistown Castle
- Thomas
- Richard
- William, of Templeogue, ancestor of the Talbots of Mount Talbot; he was the father of Richard Talbot, who like his grandfather was a High Court judge

Elizabeth outlived Thomas: as his widow, she brought a lawsuit in about 1494 against Sir James Talbot, whose precise relationship to Thomas is unclear, concerning their rival claims to certain Talbot manors.
