= Newcastle (Parliament of Ireland constituency) =

Pre-1801 Irish constituency

- Former borough constituency for the Irish House of Commons
- County: County Dublin
- Borough: Newcastle

–1801
- Replaced by: Disfranchised

Newcastle was a constituency represented in the Irish House of Commons until its abolition in 1801.

Newcastle was enfranchised by James I. By the late eighteenth century it had 13 electors, all non-resident. The patronage of the borough was sold by Lord Lanesborough to David La Touche in the between 1776 and 1779, allegedly for £7,000. The borough was disfranchised by the Acts of Union 1800, with effect from 1 January 1801, with £15,000 compensation paid under the will of David La Touche.

== Members of Parliament ==
- 1613–1615 Sir William Parsons, 1st Baronet of Bellamont and William Rolles
- 1634–1635 Sir John Dongan and Patrick Sherlock
- 1639–1642 Sir John Dongan and Sir Henry Talbot (both expelled for non-attendance)
- 1642–1646 Edmond Keating (election declared void – replaced 1643 by Arthur Whyte)
- 1646–1649 Henry Kenny and Cosny Molloy
- 1661–1666 Peter Wybrant and Francis Paisley

=== 1689–1801 ===
| Election | First member | Second member |
|---|---|---|
| 1689 | Thomas Arthur | John Talbot |
| 1692 | Richard Morris | Daniel Reading |
| 1695 | John Tench | Thomas Pooley |
| 1703 | Daniel Reading | John South |
| 1707 | Daniel Reading | John South |
| 1711 | Daniel Reading | Charles Monck |
| 1713 | Daniel Reading | Edward Deane |
| 1715 | Daniel Reading | Charles Monck |
| 1726 | Anthony Sheppard | Charles Monck |
| 1727 | Robert Sandford | James Coghill |
| 1735 | Robert Sandford | James Butler |
| 1743 | Robert Sandford | John Butler |
| 1761 | John FitzGibbon | John Butler |
| 1768 | William Stewart | John Butler |
| 1776 | Robert Gamble | John Butler |
| 1783 | David La Touche | John La Touche |
| 1785 | Thomas Whaley | John La Touche |
| 1790 | David La Touche | David La Touche |
| January 1798 | David La Touche | John La Touche (Note: Chose to sit for Harristown) |
| 1798 | David La Touche | David La Touche |
| 1801 | Constituency disfranchised | |

== Sources ==
- Leigh Rayment's historical List of Members of the Irish House of Commons. Cites: Johnston-Liik, Edith Mary (2002). The History of the Irish Parliament 1692-1800 (6 volumes). Ulster Historical Foundation.
