= Henry Talbot of Templeogue =

Irish MP elected in 1640

- Esquire of Templeogue
- Spouse: Margaret Talbot
- Issue Detail: James & others
- Father: Robert Talbot
- Mother: Eleanor Colley

Sir Henry Talbot (c. 1600 – after 1661) an Irish Catholic landowner, who was elected MP for Newcastle Borough in 1640. His marriage made him a brother-in-law of Richard Talbot, 1st Earl of Tyrconnell.

Family tree

Henry Talbot with wife, parents, and other selected relatives. (Note: This family tree is based on the genealogy of the Talbots of Mount Talbot in Burke's Landed Gentry Also see the lists of children in the text.)

Richard; Talbot d. 1577 judge	Alice; Burnell
John; Talbot d. c. 1584
Robert; Talbot; Templeogue d. 1616	Eleanor; Colley	William; 1st Baronet; Talbot d. 1634
John d. 1627	Henry	Margaret; Talbot d. 1663	Richard; 1st Earl; Tyconnell
James d. 1691; Aughrim	William; Talbot d. 1692	Lucy; Hamilton
Henry; Talbot d. 1729

Legend

XXX	Subject of the article	XXX	Talbot baronets of Carton	XXX	Earls of Tyrconnell

== Birth and origins ==
Henry was born in about 1600, probably at Templeogue, County Dublin, the second son of Robert Talbot and his wife Eleanor Colley. His father was a member of the landed gentry, seated at Templeogue. Richard Talbot (died 1577) of Templeogue, Chief Justice of the Irish Common Pleas, MP and judge, was one of his great-grandfathers. His father's family was a cadet branch of the Talbots, an Old English family.

His mother was the second daughter of Henry Colley, of Carbury Castle, County Kildare, by his second wife, Catherine Cusack.

Henry had an elder brother John, who inherited the estate at their father's death in 1616, but died childless in 1627. The Talbots of Templogue were Catholics.

== Marriage and children ==
Talbot married Margaret (died 1662), the third daughter of Sir William Talbot, 1st Baronet of Carton, County Kildare, and his wife Alison Netterville. The marriage made him a brother-in-law of Richard Talbot, who would later become Earl of Tyrconnell.

Henry and Margaret had two sons:

1. James (died 1691), colonel in the Irish army, married Bridget Bermingham, daughter of Francis de Bermingham, 12th Baron Athenry, and was killed at the Battle of Aughrim
2. William (died 1729), his successor, married Lucy, widow of George Holmes and daughter of William Hamilton of Liscloony, King's County

—and six daughters:

1. Elizabeth, married John Talbot of Belgard Castle, County Dublin
2. Bridget, married Gerrit Dillon of Manin, co. Mayo
3. Mary (died 1691), married Theobald Dillon, 7th Viscount Dillon and was accidentally killed during the Siege of Limerick
4. Alice, married Edmund Moore of Cloonbigny, "Co. Mayo" [recte "Co. Roscommon"].
5. Ellen, married Laurence Cruise, of Cruisetown, co Meath.
6. Barbara, married Dominick Browne, of Breaghwy, co. Mayo.

== Later life ==
Talbot was elected MP for Newcastle Borough in 1640.

In August 1642, Talbot together with John Dongan went to see Charles I in England and then stayed there and fought for him in the English Civil War. He was knighted by James Butler, Marquess of Ormond, in October 1646 at Kilkenny. In 1648 he was imprisoned, together with his wife. He was then transplanted to Roscommon and held 2,500 acres there.

After the Restoration of Charles II in 1660, Talbot was accused of treasonous participation in the Irish Confederate Wars of the 1640s. However, he was acquitted after being found to be an "innocent Papist", allowing him to recover his estates, which had been confiscated by the English Republic during the Cromwell era. His brother-in-law Richard was an influential figure at court and helped him to demonstrate his innocence and recover his lands.

== Death ==
Talbot died after 1661 (probably in the 1670s or 1680s) and was succeeded by his eldest son, James, who would be killed at the Battle of Aughrim in 1691.

== Notes and references ==
=== Sources ===
- Ball, Francis Elrington (1905). A History of the County of Dublin. Vol. Part Third. Dublin: Alex. Thom. – Parishes of Tallaght etc. (for Castleogue)
- Ball, F. Elrington (1926). The Judges in Ireland 1221–1921. Vol. I (1st ed.). London: John Murray. OCLC 832154869. – 1221 to 1690
- Burke, Bernard (1883). A Genealogical History of the Dormant, Abeyant, Forfeited and Extinct Peerages of the British Empire (New ed.). London: Harrison. OCLC 499232768.
- Burke, Bernard; Fox-Davies, Arthur Charles (1912). A Genealogical and Heraldic History of the Landed Gentry of Ireland (New ed.). London: Harrison & Sons. OCLC 1045621157. – (for Talbot of Mount Talbot)
- Burke, Bernard; Burke, Ashworth Peter (1915). A Genealogical and Heraldic History of the Peerage and Baronetage, the Privy Council, Knightage and Companionage (77th ed.). London: Harrison. OCLC 1155471554.
- G. E. C. (1916). Gibbs, Vicary (ed.). The Complete Peerage of England, Scotland, Ireland, Great Britain and the United Kingdom, Extant, Extinct, or Dormant. Vol. IV (2nd ed.). London: The St Catherine Press. OCLC 228661424. – Dacre to Dysart (for Dillon)
- House of Commons (1878). Return. Members of Parliament – Part II. Parliaments of Great Britain, 1705–1796. Parliaments of the United Kingdom, 1801–1874. Parliaments and Conventions of the Estates of Scotland, 1357–1707. Parliaments of Ireland, 1599–1800. London: His/Her Majesty's Stationery Office. OCLC 13112546.
- McGrath, Brid (1997). "Henry Talbot (d. 1661+) Newcastle County". A Biographical Dictionary of the Membership of the Irish House of Commons 1640 to 1641 (Ph.D.). Vol. 1. Dublin: Trinity College. pp. 282–283. – Parliaments & Biographies (PDF downloadable from given URL)
- O'Hart, John (1892). Irish Pedigrees: Or, the Origin and Stem of the Irish Nation. Vol. II (5th ed.). Dublin: James Duffy & Co. OCLC 7239210. – Normans, English, Huguenots etc.
- Shaw, William A. (1906). The Knights of England. Vol. II. London: Sherratt & Hughes. – Knights bachelors & Index
