= Peyton Survey =

1584 cadastral survey overseen by Christopher Peyton

The Peyton Survey was a 1584 cadastral survey overseen by Christopher Peyton which mapped out areas of the province of Munster in the Kingdom of Ireland.

During the heavy fighting of the Desmond Rebellion many towns and villages in Munster had been destroyed and depopulated. The government wanted to urgently rebuild the province and using earlier, smaller plantations as a model intended to bring in settlers from England and other parts of Ireland. Peyton was charged with making a circuit of Munster, collecting evidence about lands which had recently been confiscated from local owners (largely Old English but with a significant minority of Gaelic Irish) and were at the disposal of the Crown to distribute to new owners.

A similar Bodley Survey took place in 1609 for the Plantation of Ulster. A more comprehensive Down Survey in the 1650s covered the whole of Ireland.

== Bibliography ==
- MacCarthy-Morrogh, Michael. The Munster Plantation: English Migration to Southern Ireland, 1583-1641. Clarendon Press, 1986.
