= Henry Burnell (cricketer) =

English cricketer and barrister

Personal information
- Full name: Henry Blomfield Burnell
- Born: 14 November 1853; Upper Clapton, Middlesex, England
- Died: 19 October 1910 (aged 56); St John's Wood, London, England
- Batting: Unknown

Domestic team information
- Years: Team
- 1879: Marylebone Cricket Club

Career statistics
Competition	First-class
Matches	1
Runs scored	1
Batting average	1.00
100s/50s	–/–
Top score	1
Catches/stumpings	–/–
- Source: Cricinfo, 26 September 2021

Henry Blomfield Burnell (14 November 1853 — 19 October 1910) was an English first-class cricketer and barrister.

The son of Blomfield Burnell, he was born at Upper Clapton in November 1853. He was educated at Harrow School, before going up to Christ's College, Cambridge. A student of Lincoln's Inn, he was called to the bar in May 1879. In the same year he played in a first-class cricket match for the Marylebone Cricket Club against Kent at Tunbridge Wells. Batting once in the match, he was dismissed for a single run by Edward O'Shaughnessy. Burnell died at St John's Wood in October 1910.
