= John Burnell =

John Burnell (died c.1492) was an Irish judge who held office as Chief Baron of the Irish Exchequer.

The Burnell family had been Lords of the Manor of Balgriffin, County Dublin since the fourteenth century: they acquired the manor of Castleknock through marriage into the Tyrrell family, who had held the feudal barony of Castleknock, and died out around 1370. The Burnells had a strong tradition of judicial service; Robert Burnell, who was probably John's great-grandfather, and who married the Tyrrell heiress to the barony of Castleknock, was a Baron of the Court of Exchequer (Ireland) 1388–1413, as was John's cousin Patrick Burnell (died 1491). The family tradition of judicial service was continued by Henry Burnell (died 1614), who was Recorder of Dublin and a judge of the Court of King's Bench (Ireland).

John was made a Baron of the Court of Exchequer (Ireland) for life in 1478. In 1479 he had royal licence to go on a pilgrimage to England. In 1482 he was appointed Deputy to the Chief Baron of the Irish Exchequer, Oliver FitzEustace. Elrington Ball explains that a Deputy was required because Oliver was considered to be mentally deficient. He was unable to speak or apparently understand what was said to him, so that the oath of office could not be administered to him. Oliver was a natural son of the powerful Irish nobleman Rowland FitzEustace, 1st Baron Portlester, who obtained the position of Chief Baron for his son and the right to name a Deputy Chief Baron for himself. Burnell was superseded as Deputy in 1487. In 1491 he and Oliver were appointed joint Chief Barons, presumably due to Portlester's influence, but Burnell seems to have died soon afterwards. He was succeeded in his estates by his son, also called John who in 1494 was forgiven the arrears of rent owed by the estate to the Crown.

He was also Escheator for County Dublin in 1478/9.

His burial place was within the private chapel of Baron Portlester at St. Audoen's Church, where his tombstone survives.
