= John FitzGibbon (Irish lawyer) =

Irish lawyer and politician (died 1780)

John FitzGibbon (c.1708 – 11 April 1780) was an Irish lawyer and politician.

== Early life ==
FitzGibbon was the eldest son of Thomas Fitzgibbon of Ballyseeda and Honor Hayes. He was raised in County Limerick as a Roman Catholic, and at the age of sixteen he went to Paris to study medicine. He later quit medicine and studied law, entering the Middle Temple in London on 8 December 1726.

== Career ==
He was called to the Irish bar in 1731, and in November of the same year he converted to the established Church of Ireland. He also published a legal textbook, Notes on cases determined by Westminster, in 1731. Fitzgibbon amassed a considerable personal fortune practising as a barrister and consulting lawyer, with which he purchased Mountshannon House. Despite his conversion, he remained sympathetic to Irish Catholics and in March 1767 Fitzgibbon defended in court Catholics accused of Whiteboy crimes and treason.

In 1761, FitzGibbon was elected as a Member of Parliament for Newcastle in the Irish House of Commons; in 1768 he was elected to sit for Jamestown. At first he supported the government but by 1763 he had joined the opposition, where he remained until he retired from parliament in 1776. He interested himself in the economic development of Ireland and was the author of a pamphlet, Essay on commerce, published in 1777.

== Family ==
On 8 February 1738, he married Elinor Grove; they had four sons and three daughters. The three eldest sons died young, while the fourth was John FitzGibbon, who was also a lawyer and was made Earl of Clare in 1795. One of FitzGibbon's daughters was Arabella FitzGibbon, who married James St John Jeffereyes.

Parliament of Ireland
Preceded by Robert Sandford; John Butler	Member of Parliament for Newcastle; 1761–1768; With: John Butler	Succeeded by William Stewart; John Butler
Preceded by Roger Palmer; Edward Loftus	Member of Parliament for Jamestown; 1768–1776; With: James Browne	Succeeded by Viscount Westport; Richard Martin
