= James Talbot (Jacobite) =

Irish Jacobite soldier (died 1641)

- Esquire of Templeogue
- Spouse: Bridget Bermingham
- Issue Detail: Mary, Bridget, & Frances
- Father: Henry Talbot of Templeogue
- Mother: Margaret Talbot

James Talbot of Templeogue was an Irish Jacobite who served James II in the Irish Army during the War of the Two Kings (1689–91) and was killed at the Battle of Aughrim.

Family tree

James Talbot with wife, parents, and other selected relatives. (Note: This family tree is based on the genealogy of the Talbots of Mount Talbot in Burke's Landed Gentry Also see the list of children in the text.)

Robert; Talbot; Templeogue d. 1616	Eleanor; Colley	William; 1st Baronet; Talbot d. 1634
John d. 1627	Henry	Margaret; Talbot d. 1663	Richard; 1st Earl; Tyrconnell
James d. 1691; Aughrim	Bridget; Bermingham	William; Talbot d. 1692	Lucy; Hamilton
Henry; Talbot d. 1729

Legend

XXX	Subject of the article	XXX	Talbot baronets of Carton	XXX	Earls of Tyrconnell

== Birth and origins ==
James was the eldest son of Sir Henry Talbot and his wife Margaret Talbot. His father owned land around Templeogue, County Dublin.

His mother was the third daughter of Sir William Talbot, 1st Baronet of Carton, County Kildare, and his wife Alison Netterville.

He was the brother of William Talbot, also a Jacobite commander.

Due to the influence of his uncle Richard Talbot, 1st Earl of Tyrconnell, James II's viceroy in Ireland, James Talbot was given the command of a regiment in the Irish Army with the rank of colonel, although some sources refer to him as a Brigadier.

== Marriage and children ==
He married Bridget, daughter of Francis de Bermingham, 12th Baron Athenry.

James and Bridget had three daughters:

1. Mary, married in 1684 John Burke, 9th Earl of Clanricarde
2. Bridget, married Valentine Browne of Mayo
3. Frances, married Robert O'Carroll, son of Anthony "Fada" O'Carroll of Emmel Castle, Co. Offaly

== Death ==
Talbot was killed at the Battle of Aughrim, a major defeat for the Jacobites that cost them many experienced and senior officers. His death in battle meant that his estate was not covered under the terms of the Treaty of Limerick that ended the war, and was liable to forfeiture. His manor in Templeogue was granted to Sir Thomas Domvile.

== Notes and references ==
=== Sources ===
- Burke, Bernard (1883). A Genealogical History of the Dormant, Abeyant, Forfeited and Extinct Peerages of the British Empire (New ed.). London: Harrison. OCLC 499232768. – (for Talbot of Carton)
- Burke, Sir Bernard; Fox-Davies, Arthur Charles (1912). A Genealogical and Heraldic History of the Landed Gentry of Ireland (New ed.). London: Harrison & Sons. OCLC 1045621157. – (for Talbot of Mount Talbot, and O'Carroll of Athgoe Park)
