= Eleanor Burnell =

17th-century Irish poet

- Born: Ireland
- Relatives: Henry Burnell, father
- Writing career
- Language: Latin
- Period: fl. 1640

Eleanor Burnell was a 17th-century Irish poet known for her work in Latin. She was a member of the prominent Burnell family. She is considered to be the first known Irish woman Latin poet.

== Biography ==
Burnell was born to Henry Burnell and Lady Frances Dillon, third daughter of James Dillon, 1st Earl of Roscommon and his wife Eleanor Barnewall. Henry Burnell was an author and playwright of Landgartha. A Tragie-Comedy, as it was Presented in the New Theater in Dublin, with Good Applause, Being an Ancient Story. His progressive attitude toward women, which can be seen in his daughter's extensive education, may be reflected in the play Landgartha, with a verse "Bodily force too in a woman (were it but to defend its own Fort) is a perfection, though it cannot be expected but from a few of you."

Burnell's fate during the Irish Confederate Wars is unknown. Though her father is known to have joined the confederacy, the Burnell family disappeared from the historical record following the war.

== Poetry ==
One of Burnell's two surviving poems is among the prefatory verses to Henry Burnell's play Landgartha. A Tragie-Comedy, as it was Presented in the New Theater in Dublin, with Good Applause, Being an Ancient Story, which was the last play in Ireland performed before the Civil War broke out. As her life following the Civil War is unknown, no later work has survived.
