= Henry Burnell (author) =

Irish politician, playwright and landowner

- Born: Balgriffin, County Dublin
- Occupations: Politician; playwright; land owner
- Notable work: Landgartha

Henry Burnell (fl.1630s-40s, d.1656) was an Irish politician, playwright and landowner of the seventeenth century. The details of his life are not well recorded, but it is known that he was a prominent member of the Irish Confederacy which governed much of Ireland between 1642 and 1649.

He was a member of a leading Dublin landowning family, who forfeited most of their possessions after the failure of the Irish Rebellion of 1641. He is now remembered mainly as the author of Landgartha, the first play by an Irish playwright to be produced in an Irish theatre, and as the father of the poet Eleanor Burnell.

== Family ==
He was the son of Christopher Burnell of Balgriffin, and grandson of Henry Burnell, Recorder of Dublin, who died in 1614. Nothing is known of his mother; his paternal grandmother was an O'Reilly of County Cavan. The Burnell family had been landowners in Dublin since the late fourteenth century and were Lords of the Manors of Balgriffin and Castleknock. They had a long tradition of serving as judges, especially on the Court of Exchequer (Ireland). Most of them were stubbornly Roman Catholic in their religious beliefs and as a result after the Protestant Reformation their loyalty to the Crown was often suspect, a suspicion reinforced by their role in the Rebellion of Silken Thomas, in 1534-6. One John Burnell was executed at Tyburn for his part in the Rebellion. Little is known of Henry's personal life, except that he was rich and eligible enough to marry one of the Earl of Roscommon's daughters. He probably inherited his money from his grandfather, who made a fortune at the Irish Bar.

== Landgartha ==
Landgartha, Burnell's only surviving play, was produced at the Werburgh Street Theatre on St. Patrick's Day 1640. it was the first work by an Irish playwright to be produced on the Irish stage and one of the last productions before the theatre closed in 1641. The text of the play was published in Dublin in 1641 under the title "Landgartha, a tragi-comedy as it was presented in the new theatre in Dublin with good applause". The foreword contains evidence that Burnell wrote other plays which have not survived: he claims that a previous work failed due to "spite". He is thought to have collaborated with the leading English dramatist James Shirley, who was working in Dublin between 1635 and 1640. The creation of a distinctive Irish theatre was a personal project of the Lord Deputy of Ireland, Thomas Wentworth, 1st Earl of Strafford, and Burnell benefitted from his patronage, despite Strafford's generally poor relations with the Anglo-Irish gentry.

=== Summary of the play ===
The main characters are the heroine Landgartha, a Norwegian "Amazon"; Frollo, King of Sweden and conqueror of Norway; Reyner, King of Denmark; Harald, his rival, and Uraca, daughter of Frollo.

Landgartha, seeking to free her country from Frollo's tyranny, makes an alliance with Reyner and agrees to marry him. They are victorious in battle and Landgartha kills Frollo herself. She and Reyner marry and have children but her happiness is short-lived. Reyner abandons her and contemplates remarrying Uraca, but when Reyner is threatened with destruction by his rival Harald, Landgartha loyally comes to his aid and defeats Harald. The play ends on a note of reconciliation: it is agreed that the children of Landgartha and Reyner will rule both Denmark and Norway, while Uraca gives up her hope of marrying Reyner. Whether Landgartha and Reyner will live together once more as man and wife is left unclear. As a nod to the Irish audience, there is a comic character named Marfissa, who is apparently Irish.

Burnell later defended the inconclusive ending, pointing out that his play was neither a comedy nor a tragedy, but something in between (as he himself described it, a "tragicomedy"). This was a valid point since the tragicomedy was by the seventeen century familiar to English audiences.

=== Possible political themes ===
Because of the troubled period it was written in, and because of Burnell's later political career, some scholars have looked for political themes in the play. It has been suggested that Landgartha symbolises the old Anglo-Irish ruling class to which Burnell belonged, and that Reyner represents the New English aristocracy who, by denying the Anglo-Irish their full share in public life, abandoned them. In the alternative, it can be read as a straightforward defence of England's colonizing role in Ireland. A more elaborate parallel suggests that Reyner represents King Charles I of England and that the plot reflects the political turbulence which led to the English Civil War. The plot supposedly derives from a real episode in Danish history.

=== Reputation as a playwright ===
Burnell refers to the "good applause" his play received, and quotes an English writer who called him "the true heir of Ben Jonson", an opinion which few critics either then or later have shared. In more recent times, the biographer of his patron the Earl of Strafford gave her frank view that while Landgartha was an important milestone in the development of the Irish theatre, it has no merits whatsoever as a play. That this view was widely shared in Burnell's own time is suggested by his bitter reference to "the other babblers" (i.e. critics) who had apparently ridiculed his play, and whom he in turn regarded with contempt. His efforts to have an earlier play produced had failed, due in his opinion to the hostility ("spite") of his critics.

== Irish Confederacy ==
Given his status as a leading Catholic landowner of the Pale, with a long family tradition of questioning Crown policy, it was natural that Burnell should be a prominent member of the Irish Confederacy. However little is known of his role in the events of 1641–9, except that he lost his estates at Balgriffin and Castleknock almost at once, and that his family never recovered them. He was sentenced to be transported to Connaught, but apparently obtained a stay on the sentence. He was living at another family estate at Castlerickard in County Meath in 1642, and was still alive in 1655 when he pleaded ill-health as a ground for delaying his transportation. His date of death is not recorded

== Marriage and children ==
Burnell married Lady Frances Dillon, third daughter of James Dillon, 1st Earl of Roscommon and his wife Eleanor Barnewall; she died in 1640. They had four sons and five daughters who survived infancy. The most notable of their children was their daughter Eleanor, one of the few Irish women poets of the seventeenth century. Although her surviving body of work consists only of a few Latin verses, including Patri suo Charissimo operis Encomium, Eleanor is unique in being, so far as we know, the only female Anglo-Irish poet of her time.
