= Edward O'Shaughnessy =

English cricketer

Edward O'Shaughnessy (16 November 1860 – 6 August 1885) was an English cricketer who played first-class cricket for Kent and the Marylebone Cricket Club (MCC) between 1879 and 1885. He was born in Canterbury, Kent and died at St John's Wood, London.

O'Shaughnessy was a professional cricketer and played as an all-rounder – a right-handed middle-order batsman, sometimes used as an opener, and a right-arm slow bowler who bowled in the roundarm style. Most of his first-class games were for Kent, though he was also on the ground staff at Lord's. His early impact was as a bowler: against Sussex in 1879 he took seven first-innings wickets for 16 runs in 35.2 four-ball overs, and followed that in the second innings with five for 24 for match figures of 12 for 40. In the same fixture in 1882, as an opening batsman he made 98, which was his highest score. His best for MCC was an innings of 89 against Somerset in 1883.

O'Shaughnessy played a couple of times for Kent early in the 1885 season, but in early August of the same year he died of tuberculosis in London. The match between Sussex and Kent at Brighton the following week was paused for the duration of his funeral.

== Bibliography ==
- Carlaw, Derek (2020). Kent County Cricketers, A to Z: Part One (1806–1914) (PDF). Cardiff: ACS.
