= Christopher Peyton =

English lawyer (died 1612)

- Died: 1612; Kingdom of Ireland
- Occupations: Lawyer, public official
- Spouse: Anne Palmer
- Children: Anne, Cicely, Thomasine
- Parent(s): Christopher Peyton and Joanna Mildmay

Sir Christopher Peyton (died 1612) was an English lawyer known for his service in Ireland where he oversaw the Peyton Survey, a preliminary investigation in preparation for the Plantation of Munster. He was made Auditor General of Ireland, and knighted by James I for his service. He was the younger son of Christopher Peyton of St Edmundsbury; his mother, Joanna (Mildmay) Peyton, was the sister of Sir Walter Mildmay, Chancellor of the Exchequer.

He married Anne Palmer, daughter of William Palmer of Warwickshire and had three daughters, Anne, Cicely and Thomasine. Through Anne and her second husband, the third Sir Henry Colley of Castle Carbury, he was the ancestor of the Duke of Wellington. Thomasine married firstly Captain Peter Castillion, a younger son of the Italian-born courtier Giovanni Battista Castiglione, and secondly Sir Robert Pigott of Desart.

== Bibliography ==
- Betham, William The Baronetage of England Ipswich 1801 Vol. 1
- MacCarthy-Morrogh, Michael. The Munster Plantation: English Migration to Southern Ireland, 1583-1641. Clarendon Press, 1986.
