= Henry Colley (died 1584) =

Irish soldier and landowner (died 1584)

Sir Henry Colley, or Cowley (died 1584) was an Irish soldier and landowner of the Elizabethan era. He is chiefly remembered today as an ancestor of the 1st Duke of Wellington.

== Biography ==
Little is known of Colley's early years, except that he was the son of Walter Cowley (c. 1489-1558), Principal Solicitor for Ireland. Walter was the son of Robert Cowley (c. 1470-aft.1562), Master of the Rolls in Ireland. Records and monuments in Glaston, Rutland provide evidence that the Colley/Cowley family were Lords of the Manor of Glaston from about the year 1480 by John Coly born abt. 1460 & 1st Lord Colley of Glaston. Robert and his son, Walter Colley/Cowley, left Glaston for Ireland circa 1512 in the time of Henry VII.

Both Robert and Walter rose to positions of eminence through the patronage of Thomas Cromwell. Cromwell's downfall was disastrous for the Colleys/Cowleys, who were generally unpopular and mistrusted: both Robert and Walter were removed from office and imprisoned for a time in England.

Walter was born c. 1489 in Glaston. His father in his last years was restored to royal favour and appointed Surveyor-General for Ireland. He presumably left to his son a comfortable inheritance when he died in 1558. Henry was able to take a lease of Carbury Castle, County Kildare on 3 September 1538 for 31 years, and was later granted the Manor of Carbury Castle, on 4 September 1569, by Queen Elizabeth.

== Career ==
Henry's good qualities attracted the attention of Sir Henry Sidney, the Lord Deputy of Ireland, who later recalled him as a young man who was "valiant, fortunate and a good servant". He was knighted in 1560 and given a Commission of Array for Kildare, and power to impose martial law in King's County (now County Offaly) and adjoining territories. He was a member of the Privy Council of Ireland and sat on the Court of Castle Chamber (the Irish equivalent of the English Star Chamber).

His principal duty for many years was to keep the peace in King's County. Sir Henry Sidney in 1580, in recommending Henry Colley (who was by then a sick and ageing man) to his successor as Lord Deputy, Arthur Grey, 14th Baron Grey de Wilton, called him "as good a border-keeper as I have ever met", a man who had for many years kept King's County in peace and good obedience, and was personally "a sound and fast friend to me". Sir Nicholas Malby, Lord President of Connaught had written a year earlier that while Colley had kept the peace in King's County for many years he was now "sorely oppressed by rebels".

In his later years, he seems to have descended into a physical and mental decline: he was described as being "blind and helpless". He died in the early autumn of 1584.

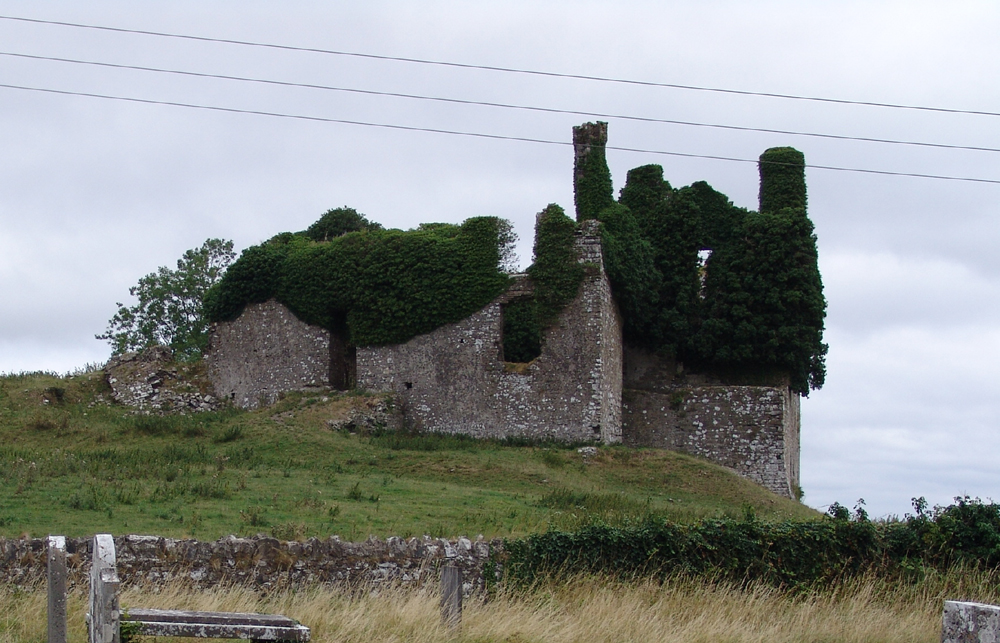
Carbury Castle

== Family ==
He married Catherine Cusack, daughter of Sir Thomas Cusack, Lord Chancellor of Ireland, whose mother was a Wellesley, the surname which the Colleys adopted in the eighteenth century. After Henry's death she remarried William Eustace; she died in 1598. She and Henry had eight children:

- Sir George Colley/Cowley of Edenderry b. 1561 d. 1614 in Edenderry, Ire., married successively Margaret Loftus and Eleanor Loftus. Sir George is the son from Henry's first unknown (Darcy) marriage & believed a daughter of Sir George Darcy.
- Sir Henry Colley (died 1601), who married Anne Loftus, daughter of Adam Loftus, Archbishop of Armagh and Jane Purdon. They were the grandparents of Dudley Colley, the patrilineal ancestor of the Duke of Wellington.
- Gerald/Garrett Cooley (Esquire) of Ardree, Louth Co. Ire. d. 1603 page 94 in the Moore, Earl of Drogheda
- Dudley b. abt. 1570 of Rakenny Townland, Cavan Co. Northern East of Dublin Ireland.
- Walter Colley, Seneschal of Wexford b. abt. 1583
- Christopher Colley b. abt. 1573
- Eleanor Colley b. abt. 1576 married Robert Talbot of Templeogue and was the mother of John Talbot and Sir Henry Talbot.
- Mary Colley (died 1654), who married firstly Garret Moore, 1st Viscount Moore, by whom she had twelve children, married secondly to Charles Wilmot, 1st Viscount Wilmot
