= Henry Burnell (judge and politician) =

Irish judge and politician

Henry Burnell (c. 1540–1614) was an Irish judge and politician; he served briefly as Recorder of Dublin and as a justice of the Court of King's Bench. Though he was willing to accept Crown office, he spent much of his career in opposition to the Government. He was one of the leaders of the protest against the policies of the Lord Deputy of Ireland Sir Henry Sidney in the late 1570s, and as a member of the Irish House of Commons in the 1580s he successfully opposed Sidney's successor, Sir John Perrot. In the early 1600s, he was one of the leaders of the protest against strict enforcement of the Penal Laws. His professional reputation was gravely damaged in his later years by a verdict that he was guilty of forgery, when he was convicted and fined for having altered a deed concerning the inheritance of the 11th Earl of Kildare's estate. He was the grandfather of the playwright Henry Burnell.

== Early life ==
He was born in Castleknock, County Dublin, son of John Burnell. The Burnells were a long-established Dublin family, which had settled at Balgriffin; they were descended from Robert Burnell, who was a Baron of the Court of Exchequer (Ireland) between about 1388 and 1413. An earlier John Burnell was briefly Chief Baron of the Irish Exchequer in the 1490s. The family were staunchly Roman Catholic and their loyalty to the Crown was sometimes questioned as a result. Henry's father had managed to retain the family estates, of which Castleknock was the most important, after his cousin, another John Burnell, had been executed for his part in the rebellion of Silken Thomas in the 1530s. Henry's father was still alive, although described as "very old", in 1577. His sister Alice married Richard Talbot of Templeogue, a prominent Dublin landowner and later a judge of the Court of Common Pleas (Ireland). Henry was at Lincoln's Inn in 1561-2 and was one of a group of Irish students who compiled a book detailing the maladministration of the Pale (those four counties which were under secure Crown control). He returned to Ireland to practice law in about 1564.

In 1573 he was appointed Recorder of Dublin but resigned a little over a year later. His motives are unclear, but since he emerged soon after as legal adviser to the Earl of Kildare, it is likely that he found private practice more lucrative. Even Sir Henry Sidney, a stern critic of Burnell, admitted to his great success at the Bar, which made him a rich man.

== Cess controversy ==
The cess, a tax levied on the landowners of the Pale, supposedly for military purposes, had always been unpopular, and Burnell had denounced it as early as 1562. In 1576 the Lord Deputy of Ireland, Henry Sidney, announced ambitious plans to reform and extend it. The landowners of the Pale protested that the cost would be ruinous. Burnell was one of a deputation of three eminent lawyers chosen to petition Elizabeth directly against the cess, the others being Richard Netterville and Barnaby Skurlock. The mission went badly: Elizabeth took grave offence at the challenge to her royal prerogative, and at Sidney's urging, she imprisoned the three lawyers in the Fleet Prison. Given his family's previous association with Silken Thomas, Burnell was clearly vulnerable to accusations of disloyalty. Sidney, while grudgingly calling him the most honest of the three lawyers (if only he would stay out of politics!), accused him of being a "perverse Papist" with "a great thirst to rid his country of the English." As opposition to Sidney's plans mounted, and he began thinking of asking for his recall to England, the political tension eased, and the three lawyers were freed in return for making an abject apology.

== Parliament of 1585 ==
Burnell and Richard Netterville returned to their opposition role in the Irish Parliament of 1585, to which Burnell had been returned as a knight of the shire for County Dublin. The new Lord Deputy Sir John Perrot, like Sidney before him, had an ambitious reform program, but the opposition thwarted him at every opportunity, even insisting on examining his accounts, for which Perrot wished them "foul scorn". He imprisoned some of the opposition members, but was unable to get his legislative program passed.

Somewhat surprisingly Burnell was once more appointed to the Bench in 1590 as third justice of the King's Bench. However he served only for a single term, which may suggest that it was only a temporary office, or that doubts had once more been raised about his loyalty. Presumably, he took the Oath of Supremacy recognising Elizabeth as Supreme Governor of the Church, as was now required of all office holders: the Oath did great violence to the Catholic conscience, but some Catholics, including Burnell's brother-in-law Richard Talbot, undoubtedly took it.

== Penal laws ==
Burnell, like most of his family, was a staunch Roman Catholic and strongly objected to the Anglican settlement; in 1605-6 he was one of the strongest supporters of Patrick Barnewall in his protest against the fines imposed for failure to attend Anglican service and the use of the Court of Castle Chamber to impose religious conformity. Yet again he was arrested but, probably because of his age, he was not imprisoned. In his last years he was much occupied with defending the liberties of the leading Catholic guild, Saint Anne's Guild.

== Digby v Earl of Kildare ==
In his last years, his professional reputation suffered greatly from the reopening of the Kildare inheritance dispute, which had begun 20 years earlier. Lettice Digby, 1st Baroness Offaly was the granddaughter and heir general of Burnell's deceased client, the 11th Earl of Kildare, and his widow Mabel Browne, who still employed Burnell as her legal advisor. Lettice and her husband deeply resented the fact that the great bulk of the Kildare inheritance had passed first to her uncle Henry FitzGerald, 12th Earl of Kildare, and then to her cousin Gerald FitzGerald, 14th Earl of Kildare. By 1602 she had learned that a crucial deed supposedly executed by her grandfather, who died in 1585, might have been forged or tampered with by his widow. She and her husband Sir Robert Digby then sued both the present Earl and the aged Dowager Countess. The case went on for over a decade and involved numerous hearings in several different courts.

In 1608 the Court of Castle Chamber, the Irish equivalent of Star Chamber, began an inquiry into the forgery allegation, which transformed a private lawsuit into a matter concerning the Crown. The old Countess admitted that she had consulted Burnell in 1585 about the deed, fearing that it did not adequately protect her jointure, and that Burnell had advised that it did not give adequate protection but that he would make the necessary alterations. Burnell himself admitted to having advised on making some alterations "but without offence" (presumably he meant without criminal intent). The Chamber acquitted the Countess of any crime, but found Burnell guilty of forgery, a "grave offence deserving severe punishment". He was subjected to a heavy fine and to be imprisoned at the Crown's pleasure, although it does not seem the latter penalty was carried out.

Jon Crawford in his detailed analysis of the trial cautions against placing too much reliance on evidence from witnesses who were describing the events of more than 20 years past. Nonetheless, Burnell did admit to having advised that the deed could be altered. Such behaviour from an eminent lawyer, whom even his critics admitted was an honest man, seems extraordinary, but the Kildares were his most important clients and he may have wished to retain the Countess' business by obliging her in the matter of the deed. Two other serious charges made against him at the same time were apparently dismissed for lack of evidence.

== Family ==
Burnell married into the O'Reilly family of Cavan; his wife died in 1605. Of their children only one son, Christopher, reached adulthood. Christopher was the father of Henry Burnell the younger, who was a leader of the Irish Confederacy and a well-known author, best remembered for his play Landgartha.

== Death and reputation ==
Burnell died at Castleknock in 1614, at a considerable age, but with his mind clear to the end. He was remembered as one of the best orators and most eminent lawyers of his time. He was somewhat vain about his legal ability, and was said to boast of his power to persuade judges to find in his favour. Despite the Kildare scandal, he was generally considered to be an honest man, as even Sir Henry Sidney, one of his sternest critics, admitted.

== Sources ==
- Stephen, Leslie, ed. (1886). "Burnell, Henry" . Dictionary of National Biography. Vol. 7. London: Smith, Elder & Co.
