= Glaston =

Village in East Midlands, England

Coordinates: 52.595°N 0.678°W

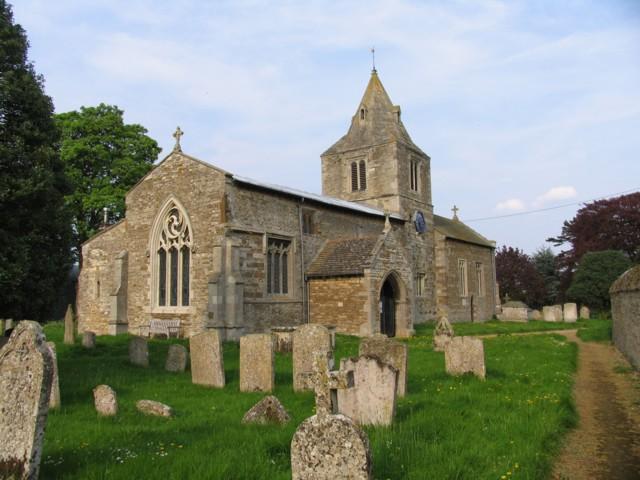
- St Andrew's Church, Glaston

- Location within Rutland
- Area: 1.83 sq mi (4.7 km^{2})
- Population: 185 2001 Census
  - Density: 101/sq mi (39/km^{2})
- OS grid reference: SK896005
  - London: 79 miles (127 km) SSE
- Unitary authority: Rutland
- Shire county: Rutland
- Ceremonial county: Rutland
- Region: East Midlands
- Country: England
- Sovereign state: United Kingdom
- Post town: OAKHAM
- Postcode district: LE15
- Dialling code: 01572
- Police: Leicestershire
- Fire: Leicestershire
- Ambulance: East Midlands
- UK Parliament: Rutland and Stamford

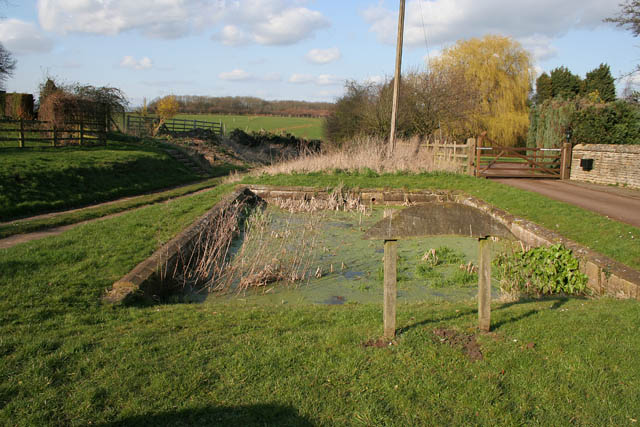
The cartwash

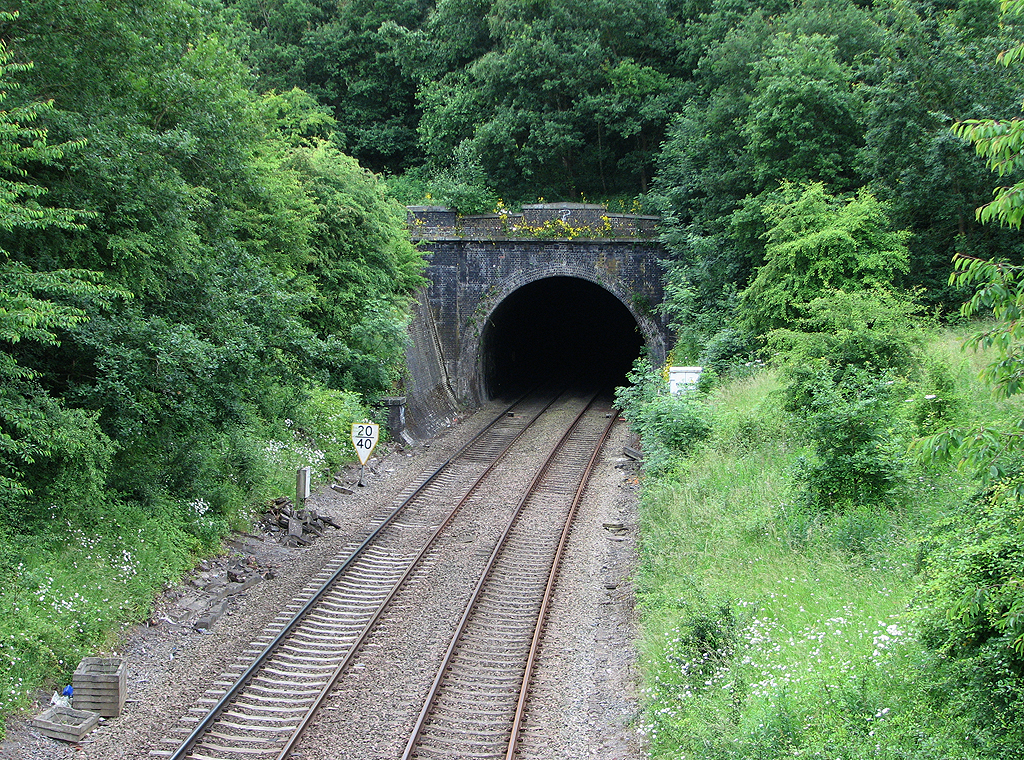
The north portal of Glaston Tunnel

Glaston is a village in the county of Rutland in the East Midlands of England. The population of the civil parish remained unchanged between the 2001 and the 2011 censuses.

The village's name means 'farm/settlement of Glathr'.

Glaston is about 4 miles (6.4 kilometres) south of Rutland Water and is situated on the A47, 2 miles (3.2 kilometres) east of Uppingham. There are approximately 80 houses in total with one public house, The Old Pheasant (previously the Monckton Arms) on Main Road (A47), and a flooring warehouse, Glaston Carpets. There is an active parish meeting that is held once a month and villagers are trying to get a bypass for the village.

A rectangular pond is a cartwash of circa 1740, used for soaking cartwheels to prevent the wood shrinking from iron tyres and also for horses' hooves to prevent hardening.

Glaston railway tunnel, 1 mile 82 yards in length, is located within the parish, to the east of the village.

4 Parachute Squadron, Royal Engineers were billeted in Glaston and at Bisbrooke Hall in the months before Operation Market Garden in September 1944. A memorial in the parish church records 19 names.

== St Andrew's Church ==
St Andrew's Church, Glaston, the Church of England parish church, is a Grade II* listed building. In 1663 the advowson was given to Peterhouse, Cambridge by Bernard Hale, the Master of the college. Masters of Peterhouse were Rector of Glaston until 1867, when the rectory was detached from the headship by new college statutes.

St Andrew's suffered from heritage crime in 2018 and was placed on the Heritage at Risk Register.

== Early history ==
Archaeologists working in the parish in 2000 discovered a late Pleistocene (c. 30,000 b.p.) faunal assemblage in association with an Upper Palaeolithic flint "leafpoint".

== Wellington and Colley ==
Glaston has a connection with the Duke of Wellington. Although his family adopted the name Wesley or Wellesley, their original name was Colley, and they were possibly descended from the English-born judge Robert Cowley or Colley who came to Ireland about 1505-06. Robert was almost certainly born in Glaston, where the Colley family were Lords of the Manor from about 1400. Richard Colley (c. 1690 – 1758), the grandfather of Arthur Wellesley, 1st Duke of Wellington, changed his surname to Wesley in 1728 when he inherited estates on the death of his cousin, Garret Wesley but was supposed to add the last name of Wellesley not Wesley as Garrets father was Garret Wellesley so Richard could carry on the Wellesley Coat of Arms to get the inheritance, this is why the Duke & his brother corrected the last name from Wesley to Wellesley while in India.

Colley Cibber (1671–1757), English actor-manager, playwright and Poet Laureate was the eldest child of Jane née Colley, from the Glaston family.
