= Richard Wesley, 1st Baron Mornington =

Irish peer

The Right Honourable The Lord Mornington
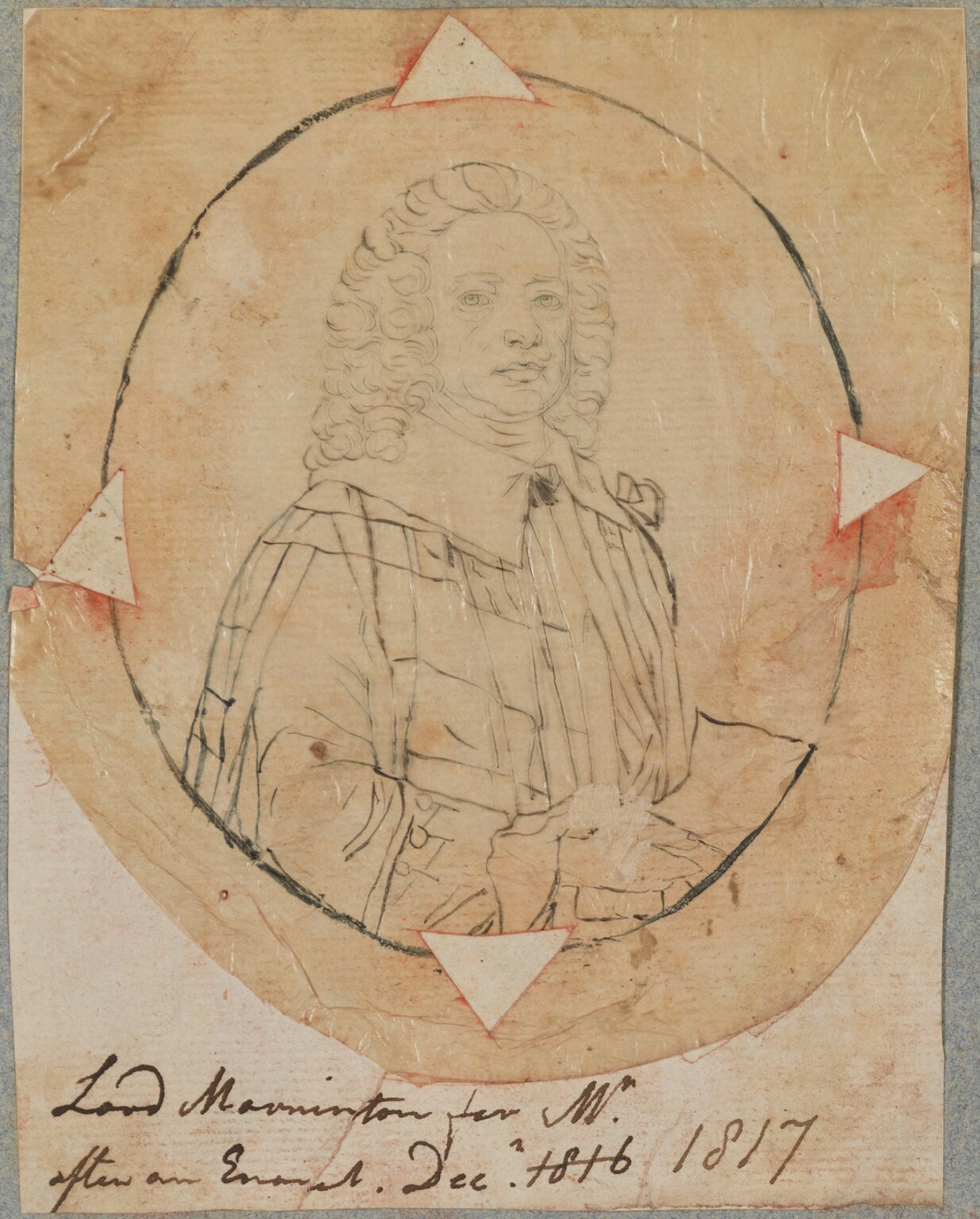
- Portrait by Henry Pierce Bone, 1817
- Born: c. 1690
- Died: 31 January 1758
- Spouse: Elizabeth Sale
- Parent(s): Henry Colley; Mary Usher

Richard Colley Wesley, 1st Baron Mornington (c. 1690 – 31 January 1758) was an Irish peer best known for being the grandfather of Arthur Wellesley, 1st Duke of Wellington.

== Biography ==
Richard Colley (as he was christened) was born around 1690, the son of Henry Colley (died 1719) and Mary, daughter of Sir William Ussher. Wesley had a notable younger brother: Henry Colley (died 1723). He graduated from Trinity College, Dublin with a BA in 1711 and an MA in 1714 as Richard Colley. In the intervening year he held the office of Chamberlain of the Court of Exchequer (Ireland).

On 23 September 1728 Colley inherited the estates of Dangan and Mornington, in County Meath, on the death of his cousin, Garret Wesley. (Note: In his Tour in Ireland (1752) Richard Pococke described Dangan Castle, Mornington's home, as follows: "We soon after came to Dangan the seat of Lord Mornington situated on a most beautiful flat, with an Amphitheater of hills rising round it, one over another, in a most beautiful manner; at the lower end is a very large piece of water, at one corner of which is an Island, it is a regular fortification, there is a ship a sloop and boats on the water, and a yard for building; the hill beyond it, is improved into a beautiful wilderness: on a round hill near the house is a Temple, and the hills round are adorned with obelisks: Pillars and some buildings, altogether the most beautiful thing I ever saw".(Pococke 2010, p. 235)) Less than two months later on 15 November 1728 he legally changed his surname to Wesley.

Between 1729 and 1746 Wesley represented Trim in the Irish House of Commons. He was High Sheriff of Meath in 1734 and he was created Baron Mornington in the Peerage of Ireland on 9 July 1746.

== Character ==
Wellington's biographer described his grandfather as "a civilised and eccentric country gentleman". The diarist Mary Delany (who was Garret's godmother) visiting Dangan in 1748 after a 17-year gap, found him "the same good-humoured, agreeable man he was on my last visit", and praised him as the man with most merits and fewest faults of anyone she knew, valuing wealth only as a means to make others happy. He was proud of, and fostered, his son's musical talent, but he was also extravagant, and died in debt, beginning the cycle of family indebtedness which eventually led to his eldest grandson Richard selling Dangan 40 years later.

== Family ==
The Colley or Cowley family had come to Ireland from Glaston, in Rutland about 1500; Sir Henry Colley was elevated to the Peerage as Lord Glaston by Henry VIII. He married the daughter of Thomas Cusack, Lord Chancellor of Ireland, Catherine Wellesley Cusack (d. 1598) whose grandmother was a Wellesley. Upon the death of his cousin, Garret Wesley and his inheritance of the estates of Dangan and Mornington, Richard Colley (d. 1758) and his wife Elizabeth Sale (d. 17 June 1738) daughter of John Sale MP, Registrar of the Diocese of Dublin, on 23 December 1719. adopted the name Wellesley (from both Elizabeth's maternal family side from Catherine Wellesley Cusack, her grandmother) and through her husband's family, his cousin, Garret Wesley (Wellesley).

They had one son and two daughters:

- Garret Wesley, 1st Earl of Mornington. Garret Wesley's ( Wellesley's) offspring included Richard Wellesley, 1st Marquess Wellesley, William Wellesley-Pole, 3rd Earl of Mornington, Arthur Wellesley, 1st Duke of Wellington and Henry Wellesley, 1st Baron Cowley
- Frances, who married William Francis Crosbie
- Elizabeth, who married Chichester Fortescue

== Notes ==
Peerage of Ireland
New creation	Baron Mornington; 1746–1758	Succeeded by Garret Wellesley
