= Garret Wesley =

Irish Member of Parliament

Garret Wesley (circa 1665 – 28 September 1728) was an Irish Member of Parliament.

He represented Trim from 1692 to 1693, Athboy from 1695 to 1699, County Meath from 1711 to 1714 and then Trim again from 1727 to his death.

He was the son of Garret Wesley I and Elizabeth Colley. He married Katherine Keating but had no issue. His maternal great-grandfather was Dudley Colley: on his death he left his property to his cousin Richard Wesley, 1st Baron Mornington, on condition that he take the surname Wesley. Richard was the grandfather of Arthur Wellesley, 1st Duke of Wellington.
