= Carbury Castle, County Kildare =

Ruined castle in Ireland

Coordinates: 53°21′42″N 6°58′08″W

Carbury Castle
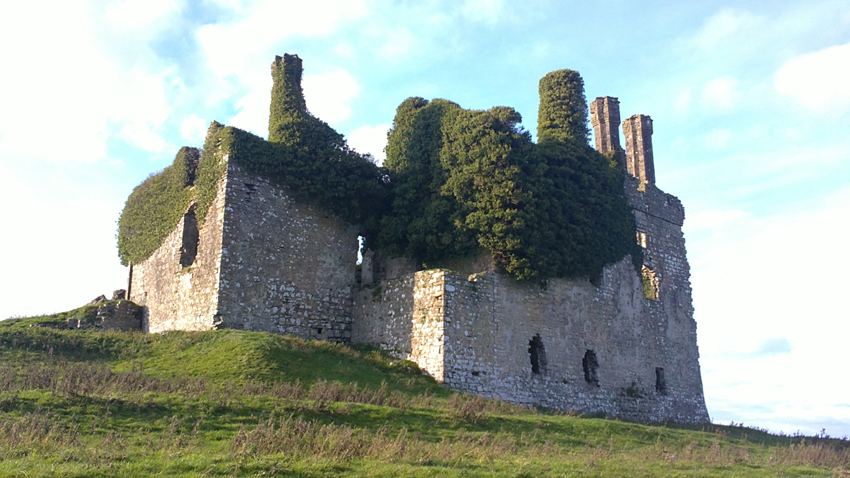
- Carbury south-west facade

Site information
- Type: Motte and Bailey
- Open to the public: Yes
- Condition: Ruins

Site history
- Built: before 900 AD
- Built by: Pierce St. Leger
- In use: Until 1927
- Materials: Limestone

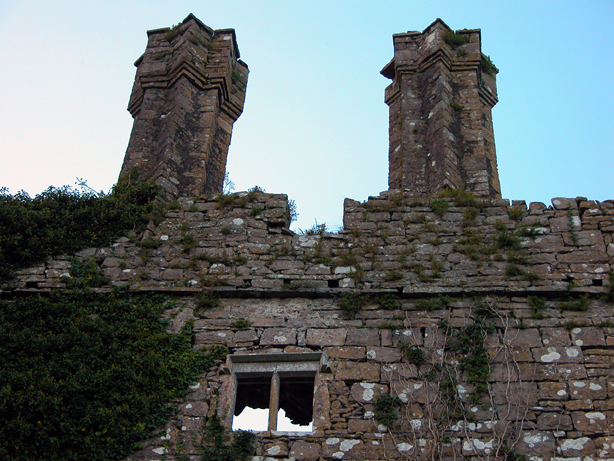
Window detail

Carbury Castle is a castle situated in the townland of Carbury, near the border between County Kildare and County Offaly.

Carbury Castle was built in the 13th century by Pierce St. Leger.

== Name ==
Carbury is called after Cairbre, son of Niall of the Nine Hostages. The chieftain is supposed to have entertained St Patrick but instead of serving up a lamb or venison or other suitable roast, he served up a greyhound on a dish. This was done out of disrespect for the saint. The saint, however, before commencing dining, blessed the food and immediately the greyhound came back to life and walked off the table and out the door. Cairbre was reputedly married to Boinne, after whom the Boyne is called. The Boyne rises in the grounds of Newberry Hall, now owned by a Mr Robinson. Near the source of the Boyne is a Holy Well called Trinity Well, the water of which is supposed to cure Tooth Aches. The Berminghams occupied the Castle for 200(?) years after which it passed to the Colleys, ancestors of the Wellesleys.

== History ==
The castle was first built by the Normans and the motte on the hill was probably built by Meiler FitzHenry who was granted the area by Strongbow. The central scenic focus of Carbury Hill is the ruins of the Tudor mansion of the Colleys, which was also known as Fairy Hill. It was acquired by the de Berminghams in the 14th century, from whom it passed by inheritance to the Preston family, who held the title Baron Gormanston, before being taken by the native Irish in the 15th century. The 1st Earl of Shrewsbury, John Talbot, later also Earl of Wexford, Earl of Waterford and Baron of Dungarvan, rebuilt Carbury Castle sometime after 1429–1447.

From 23 October 1554 a 21-year lease was granted to Sir Henry Colley (the patrilineal ancestor of the Dukes of Wellington); this was renewed, and the Colley family built a large stronghouse on the hilltop in the 17th century, now a ruin.
