= Earl of Mornington =

Title in the peerage of Ireland

Earldom of Mornington
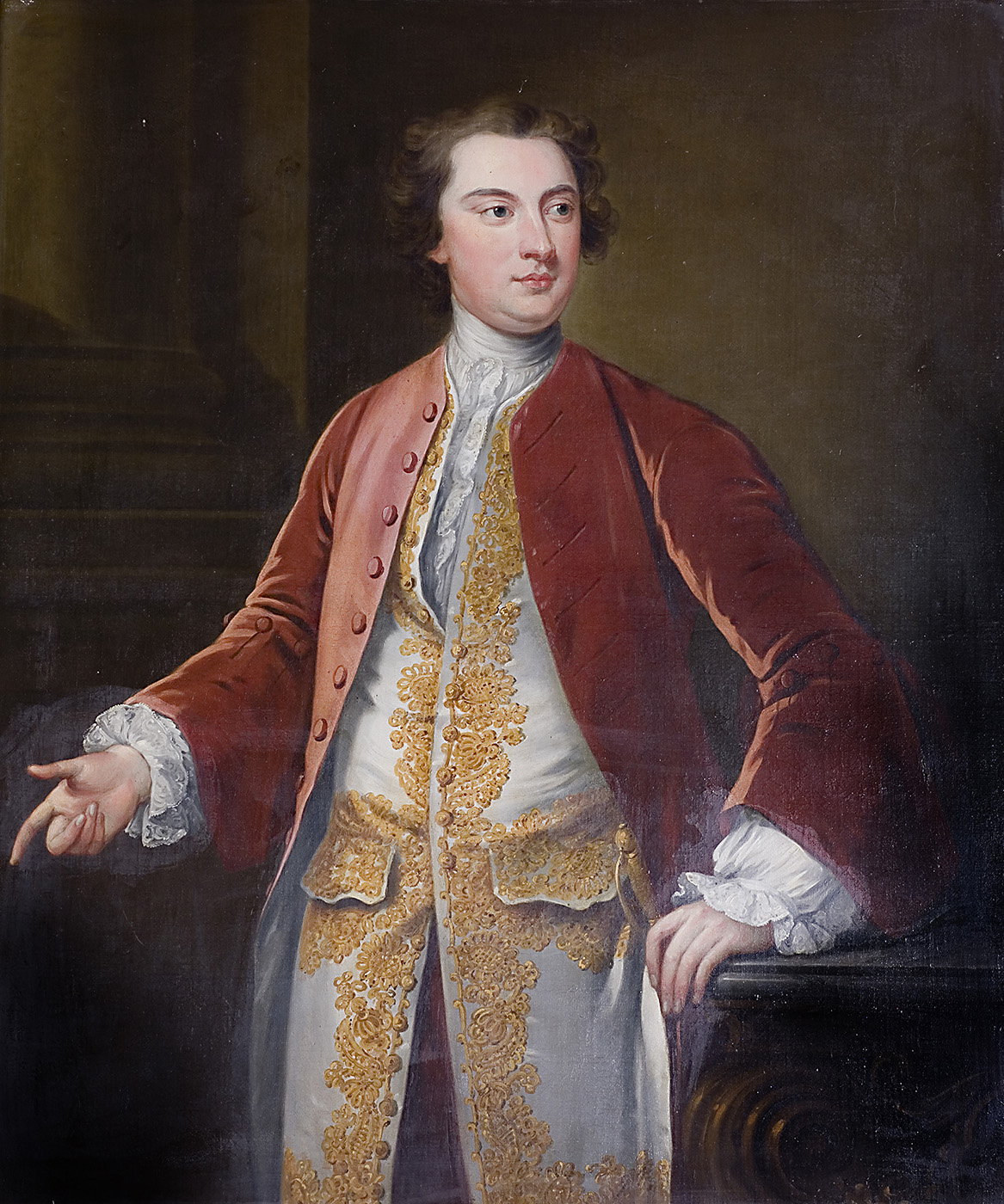
- Creation date: 1760
- Created by: George II
- Peerage: Peerage of Ireland
- First holder: Garret Wesley, 1st Earl of Mornington
- Present holder: Charles Wellesley, 9th Duke of Wellington
- Heir apparent: Arthur Wellesley, Earl of Mornington
- Remainder to: the 1st Earl's heirs male of the body lawfully begotten
- Subsidiary titles: Viscount Wellesley of Dangan Castle, in the County of Meath
- Status: Subsidiary title of the Duke of Wellington
- Seat: Stratfield Saye House
- Former seat: Dangan Castle

Earl of Mornington is a title in the Peerage of Ireland. It was created in 1760 for the Anglo-Irish politician and composer Garret Wellesley, 2nd Baron Mornington. On the death of the fifth earl in 1863, it passed to the Duke of Wellington; since that date, the title has generally been used by courtesy for the heir apparent to the heir apparent to the dukedom.

== History ==
The first earl was the eldest son of Richard Wesley, the first Baron Mornington. Richard Wesley, born Richard Colley, was elevated to the Peerage of Ireland as Baron Mornington, of Mornington, in 1746. He had inherited the Dangan and Mornington estates in County Meath on the death of his first cousin Garret Wesley in 1728. In the same year he was granted by Royal licence the new surname of Wesley (see below for earlier history of the family).

His son, the second Baron, was made the first Earl of Mornington in 1760, and at the same time also became Viscount Wellesley, of Dangan Castle in the County of Meath, also in the Peerage of Ireland.

Four of the first earl's sons gained distinction. The third son was Arthur Wellesley, 1st Duke of Wellington, who defeated Napoleon Bonaparte at the Battle of Waterloo in 1815 (see Duke of Wellington), while the fifth was the diplomat Henry Wellesley, 1st Baron Cowley (see Earl Cowley).

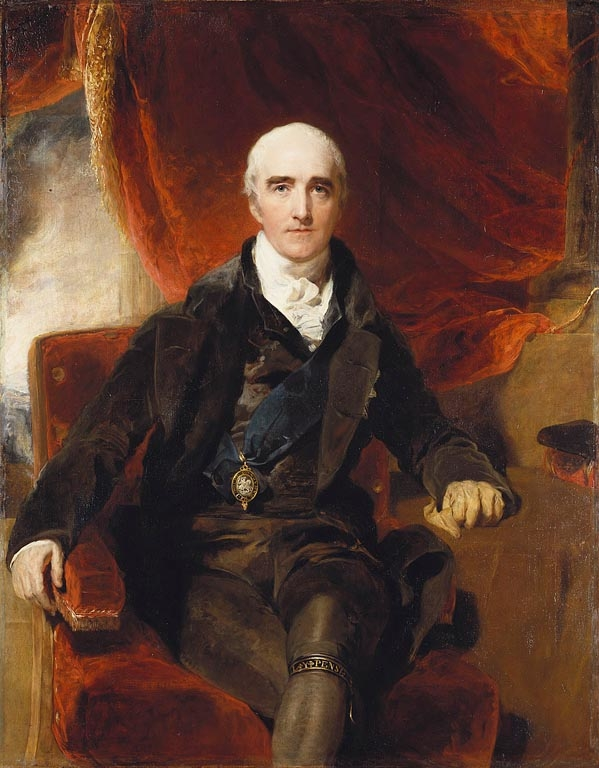
Portrait of the Marquess Wellesley by Thomas Lawrence, 1813

The first earl was succeeded by his eldest son, Richard, the second earl. He used the original family surname of Wellesley in lieu of Wesley. He was a prominent soldier, diplomat and politician. In 1797 he was created Baron Wellesley, of Wellesley in the County of Somerset, in the Peerage of Great Britain, which entitled him to a seat in the British House of Lords. In 1799 he was further honoured when he was made Marquess Wellesley, of Norragh, in the Peerage of Ireland. However, he was said to be bitterly disappointed at not receiving a dukedom or at least an English peerage of high rank. He referred to his Irish marquessate as a "double-gilt potato". Lord Wellesley had several children by his French mistress, Hyacinthe-Gabrielle Roland (they were married in 1794 after the birth of their children). One of them, Anne, married as her second husband Lord Charles Bentinck. They were great-great-grandparents of Queen Elizabeth II.

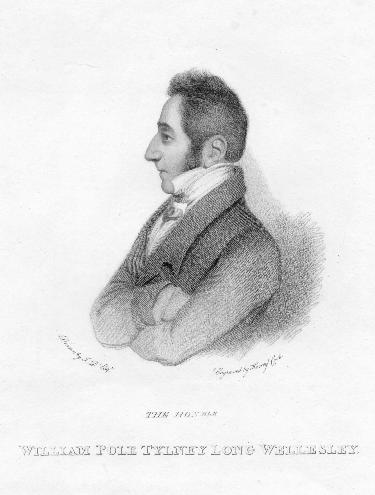
William Pole-Tylney-Long-Wellesley, 4th Earl of Mornington

As Lord Wellesley had no legitimate children, the English barony of 1797 and the marquessate became extinct on his death in 1842. He was succeeded in the other titles by his younger brother William Wellesley-Pole, 1st Baron Maryborough, who became the third Earl of Mornington. He was also a politician and notably served as Chief Secretary for Ireland between 1809 and 1812 and as Chancellor of the Irish Exchequer between 1811 and 1812. Born William Wesley, he assumed by Royal licence in 1781 the additional surname of Pole on succeeding to the estates of his cousin, William Pole. In 1798 he assumed by Royal licence the surname of Wellesley-Pole in lieu of Wesley-Pole. In 1821 he was raised to the Peerage of the United Kingdom as Baron Maryborough, of Maryborough in the Queen's County. He was succeeded by his son, the fourth Earl. He married Catherine, daughter and coheir of Sir James Tylney-Long, 7th Baronet (see Tylney-Long Baronets). She was known in London society as "The Wiltshire heiress" and was believed to be the richest commoner in England. On his marriage he assumed by Royal licence the additional surnames of Tylney and Long.

Lord Mornington is chiefly remembered for his dissipated lifestyle which brought about the destruction of the Tylney family estate of Wanstead House. He was succeeded by his eldest and only surviving son, the fifth Earl. He had been the subject of a bitter custody battle between his father and his two maternal aunts (who had wanted him to be placed under the guardianship of his great-uncle the Duke of Wellington) and later fought a legal battle with his father over the sale of contents of the family seat Draycot House. Lord Mornington died unmarried in 1863 when the barony of Maryborough became extinct. He left all his landed property to his father's cousin Henry Wellesley, 1st Earl Cowley. He was succeeded in his Irish titles by his first cousin once removed, Arthur Wellesley, 2nd Duke of Wellington. The title Earl of Mornington is now used as a courtesy title by the heir apparent to the Marquess of Douro, himself the heir apparent to the Duke of Wellington. As of 2015, the title is held by courtesy by Arthur Wellesley, Earl of Mornington, son of Arthur Wellesley, Marquess of Douro and grandson of Charles Wellesley, 9th Duke of Wellington.

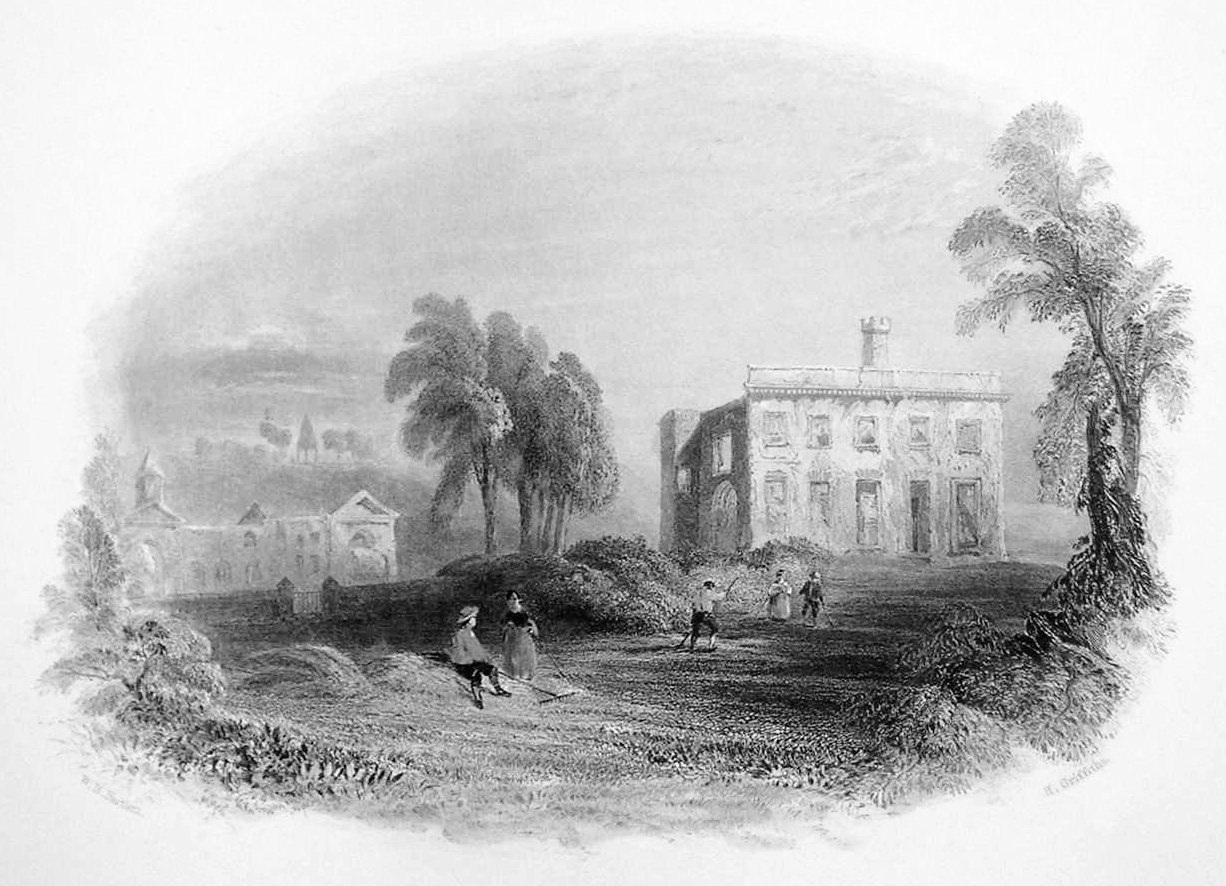
Dangan Castle, c. 1840

The Wesley or Wellesley family descended from Sir Richard de Wellesley (15th century). His grandson Sir William Wellesley (died 1602) lived at Dangan Castle, County Meath. The family estates passed down the male lines. One of Wellesley's daughters, Alison, married John Cusack. Their son Sir Thomas Cusack served as Lord Chancellor of Ireland between 1551 and 1554. His daughter, Katherine, married Sir Henry Colley (or Cowley) (16th century), of Castle Carbery, County Kildare. Their grandson Sir Henry Colley represented County Monaghan in the Irish Parliament. One of Sir Henry's sons, Dudley Colley (or Cowley), was a member of the Irish Parliament for Philipstown. His son Henry Colley (or Cowley) was the father of Henry Cowley, who represented Strabane in the Irish House of Commons, and of Garret Wesley, 1st Baron Mornington. The aforementioned Garret Wesley (died 1728) was a descendant of Sir William Wellesley (died 1602) as well as the son of Elizabeth, daughter of the aforementioned Dudley Colley, also the paternal grandfather of the first Baron Mornington.

The country seat of the Wellesley family was Dangan Castle, near Summerhill, County Meath. The Dublin residence of the family was Mornington House, Merrion Street.

== Barons Mornington (1746) ==
- Richard Wesley, 1st Baron Mornington (1690–1758)
- Garret Wesley, 2nd Baron Mornington (1735–1781) (created Earl of Mornington in 1760)

== Earls of Mornington (1760) ==
- Garret Wesley, 1st Earl of Mornington (1735–1781)
- Richard Wellesley, 2nd Earl of Mornington (1760–1842) (created Baron Wellesley in 1797 and Marquess Wellesley in 1799)

== Marquesses Wellesley (1799) ==
- Richard Wellesley, 1st Marquess Wellesley, 2nd Earl of Mornington (1760–1842)

== Earls of Mornington (1760; Reverted) ==
- William Wellesley-Pole, 3rd Earl of Mornington (1763–1845)
- William Pole-Tylney-Long-Wellesley, 4th Earl of Mornington (1788–1857)
- William Richard Arthur Pole-Tylney-Long-Wellesley, 5th Earl of Mornington (1813–1863)
- Arthur Richard Wellesley, 2nd Duke of Wellington, 6th Earl of Mornington (1807–1884)

for further succession, see Duke of Wellington (title)

== Barons Maryborough (1821) ==
- William Wellesley-Pole, 1st Baron Maryborough (1763–1845) (succeeded as Earl of Mornington in 1842)

see above for further succession

== Family tree ==
Wellesley family tree: Dukes of Wellington, Victoria, and Ciudad Rodrigo, and Princes of Waterloo

Baron Mornington of Mornington, 1746
Richard Colley Wesley; 1690–1758; 1st Baron Mornington
Earl of Mornington and Viscount Wellesley, of Dangan Castle in the County of Meath, 1760
Richard Colley Wesley; 1735–1781; 1st Earl of Mornington, etc., 2nd Baron Mornington
Baron Wellesley of Wellesley in the County of Somerset, 1797; Marquess Wellesley of Norragh, 1799	Baron Maryborough of Maryborough in the Queen's County, 1821	Viscount Wellington (UK), 1809; Count of Vimeiro (Portugal), 1811; Marquess of Wellington (UK), 1812; Duke of Ciudad Rodrigo (Spain), 1812; Duke of Victoria and Marquess of Torres Vedras (Portugal), 1812; Duke of Wellington (UK) and Marquess Douro and Baron Douro (Portugal), 1814; Prince of Waterloo (Netherlands), 1815
Richard Wellesley; 1760–1842; Marquess Wellesley, etc., 2nd Earl of Mornington, etc., 3rd Baron Mornington	William Wellesley-Pole; 1763–1845; 3rd Earl of Mornington, etc., 4th Baron Mornington, 1st Baron Maryborough	Arthur Wellesley; 1769–1852; 1st Duke of Wellington, etc.
Marquessate Wellesley and Barony Wellesley extinct, 1842
William Pole-Tylney-Long-Wellesley; 1788–1857; 4th Earl of Mornington, etc., 5th Baron Mornington, 2nd Baron Maryborough	Arthur Richard Wellesley; 1807–1884; 2nd Duke of Wellington, etc., 6th Earl of Mornington, etc.	Lord Charles Wellesley; 1808–1858
William Pole-Tylney-Long-Wellesley; 1813–1863; 5th Earl of Mornington, etc., 6th Baron Mornington, 3rd Baron Maryborough	Henry Wellesley; 1846–1900; 3rd Duke of Wellington, etc., 7th Earl of Mornington, etc.	Arthur Charles Wellesley; 1849–1934; 4th Duke of Wellington, etc., 8th Earl of Mornington, etc.
Barony Maryborough extinct, 1863
Arthur Charles Wellesley; 1876–1941; 5th Duke of Wellington, etc., 9th Earl of Mornington, etc.	Gerald Wellesley; 1885–1972; 7th Duke of Wellington, etc., 8th Duke of Ciudad Rodrigo, 10th Earl of Mornington, etc.
Anne Rhys; 1910–1998; 7th Duchess of Ciudad Rodrigo	Henry Valerian George Wellesley; 1912–1943; 6th Duke of Wellington, etc., 11th Earl of Mornington, etc.	Arthur Valerian Wellesley; 1915–2014; 8th Duke of Wellington, etc., 9th Duke of Ciudad Rodrigo, 12th Earl of Mornington, etc.
Baron Wellington of Stratfield Saye, 2026
Arthur Charles Valerian Wellesley b. 1945; 9th Duke of Wellington, etc., 10th Duke of Ciudad Rodrigo, 13th Earl of Mornington, etc., Baron Wellington of Stratfield Saye
Arthur Gerald Wellesley styled Marquess of Douro b. 1978
Arthur Darcy Wellesley b. 2010 styled Earl of Mornington

== Line of succession ==
- Richard Wesley, 1st Baron Mornington (1690–1758)
  - Garret Wesley, 1st Earl of Mornington (1735–1781)
    - Richard Wellesley, 1st Marquess Wellesley (1760–1842)
    - William Wellesley-Pole, 3rd Earl of Mornington (1763–1845)
      - William Pole-Tylney-Long-Wellesley, 4th Earl of Mornington (1788–1857)
        - William Pole-Tylney-Long-Wellesley, 5th Earl of Mornington (1813–1863)
        - The Hon. James Pole-Tylney-Long-Wellesley (1815–1851)
    - Arthur Wellesley, 1st Duke of Wellington, (1769–1852)
      - Arthur Wellesley, 2nd Duke of Wellington, 6th Earl of Mornington (1807–1884)
      - Lord Charles Wellesley (1808–1858)
        - Henry Wellesley, 3rd Duke of Wellington, 7th Earl of Mornington (1846–1900)
        - Arthur Wellesley, 4th Duke of Wellington, 8th Earl of Mornington (1849–1934)
          - Arthur Wellesley, 5th Duke of Wellington, 9th Earl of Mornington (1876–1941)
            - Henry Wellesley, 6th Duke of Wellington, 10th Earl of Mornington (1912–1943)
          - Gerald Wellesley, 7th Duke of Wellington, 11th Earl of Mornington (1885–1972)
            - Valerian Wellesley, 8th Duke of Wellington, 12th Earl of Mornington (1915–2014)
              - Charles Wellesley, 9th Duke of Wellington, 13th Earl of Mornington (b. 1945)
                - (1) Arthur Wellesley, Earl of Mornington (b. 1978)
                  - (2) Arthur Wellesley, Viscount Wellesley (b. 2010)
                  - (3) Hon. Alfred Wellesley (b. 2014)
                - (4) Lord Frederick Wellesley (b. 1992)
              - (5) Lord Richard Wellesley (b. 1949)
              - (6) Lord John Wellesley (b. 1954)
                - (7) Gerald Wellesley (b. 1981)
              - (8) Lord James Wellesley (b. 1956)
                - (9) Oliver Wellesley (b. 2005)
          - Lord George Wellesley (1889–1967)
            - Richard Wellesley (1920–1984)
              - John Wellesley (1962–2009)
                - (10) Thomas Wellesley (b. 2000)
    - Gerald Wellesley (1770–1848)
      - Arthur Richard Wellesley (1804–1830)
      - William Wellesley (1813–1888)
        - Arthur Wellesley (1850–1893)
          - Garret Wellesley (1880–1915)
        - Gerald Wellesley (1852–1914)
          - Cyril Wellesley (1879–1915)
          - Frederick Wellesley (1880–1955)
            - Frederic Wellesley (1908–1978)
        - Edmond Wellesley (1858–1886)
          - Gerald Wellesley (1885–1933)
            - Edmund Wellesley (1919–1944)
            - Philip Wellesley (1921–1992)
          - Edmond Wellesley (1886–1916)
        - Herbert Wellesley (1867–1905)
          - Ronald Wellesley (1894–1914)
          - Eric Wellesley (1896–1915)
      - George Wellesley (1814–1901)
    - Henry Wellesley, 1st Baron Cowley (1773–1847)
      - Henry Wellesley, 1st Earl Cowley (1804–1884)
        - William Wellesley, 2nd Earl Cowley (1834–1895)
          - Henry Wellesley, 3rd Earl Cowley (1866–1919)
            - Arthur Wellesley, 4th Earl Cowley (1890–1962)
              - Denis Wellesley, 5th Earl Cowley (1921–1968)
                - Richard Wellesley, 6th Earl Cowley (1946–1975)
              - Garret Wellesley, 7th Earl Cowley (1934–2016)
                - (11) Graham Wellesley, 8th Earl Cowley (born 1965)
                  - (12) Henry Wellesley, Viscount Dangan (born 1991)
                  - (13) Hon. Bertram Wellesley (born 1999)
              - (14) Hon. Brian Wellesley (born 1938)
            - Hon. Henry Wellesley (1907–1981)
              - (15) Henry Wellesley (born 1970)
                - (16) Jay Wellesley (born 2001)
              - (17) Richard Wellesley (born 1972)
      - Hon. Captain William Wellesley (1806–1875)
        - Gerald Edward Wellesley (1846–1915)
          - Gerald Valerian Wellesley (1885–1961)
            - Julian Valerian Wellesley (1933–1996)
              - (18) William Valerian Wellesley (born 1966)
                - (19) Julian Valerian Arthur Wellesley (born 1997)
                - (20) George Edward Valerian Wellesley (born 2007)
      - Hon. Gerald Valerian Wellesley (1809–1882)
        - Albert Wellesley (?–?)

== See also ==
- Earl Cowley
- Tylney-Long baronets
- Earl Tylney
