= Duchess of Wellington =

Duchess of Wellington is the title given to the wife of the Duke of Wellington. Women who have held the title include:

- Catherine Wellesley, Duchess of Wellington (1773–1831)
- Elizabeth Wellesley, Duchess of Wellington (1820–1904)
- Evelyn Wellesley, Duchess of Wellington (1855–1939), wife of Henry Wellesley, 3rd Duke of Wellington
- Kathleen Wellesley, Duchess of Wellington (1848–1927), wife of Arthur Wellesley, 4th Duke of Wellington
- Lilian Wellesley, Duchess of Wellington (1885–1946), wife of Arthur Wellesley, 5th Duke of Wellington
- Dorothy Wellesley, Duchess of Wellington (1889–1956), wife of Gerald Wellesley, 7th Duke of Wellington
- Diana Wellesley, Duchess of Wellington (1922–2010)
- Princess Antonia, Duchess of Wellington (born 1955), current holder of the title

In popular culture:

- The 2009 Filipino comedy film Yaya and Angelina: The Spoiled Brat Movie featured a fictionalized (and unnamed) Duchess of Wellington, who was the subject of a terrorist plot in the movie. The duchess was portrayed by Michael V., who also portrayed one of the titular characters, Rosalinda "Yaya" Lucero.
