= Valerian Wellesley, 8th Duke of Wellington =

British peer and army officer (1915–2014)

Brigadier His Grace The Duke of Wellington KG LVO OBE MC DL
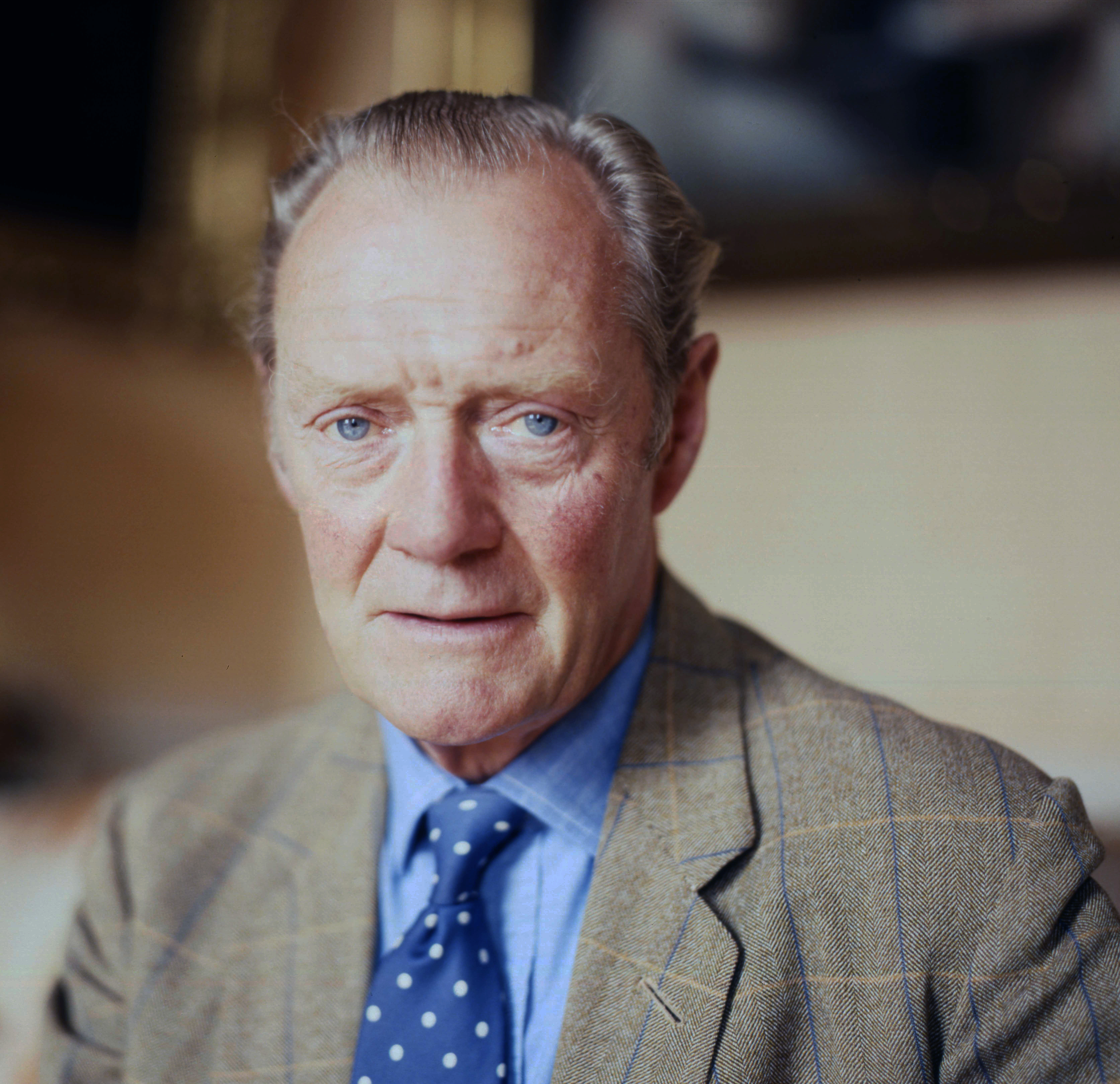
- The Duke in 1984, by Allan Warren

Member of the House of Lords
- Lord Temporal
- In office 4 January 1972 – 11 November 1999
- Preceded by: The 7th Duke of Wellington
- Succeeded by: Seat abolished (Note: Under the House of Lords Act 1999.)

Personal details
- Born: Arthur Valerian Wellesley; 2 July 1915 Rome, Kingdom of Italy
- Died: 31 December 2014 (aged 99) Stratfield Saye House
- Resting place: Stratfield Saye House
- Spouse: Diana McConnel (m. 1944; died 2010)
- Children: Charles Wellesley, 9th Duke of Wellington; Lord Richard Wellesley; Lady Jane Wellesley; Lord John Wellesley; Lord James Wellesley
- Parent(s): Gerald Wellesley, 7th Duke of Wellington; Dorothy Violet Ashton
- Education: New College, Oxford

Military service
- Allegiance: United Kingdom
- Branch/service: British Army
- Years of service: 1936–1968
- Rank: Brigadier
- Commands: 22nd Armoured Brigade; Household Cavalry Regiment; Royal Horse Guards Regiment
- Battles/wars: Second World War: North African Campaign; Cyprus dispute
- Awards: Knight Companion of the Garter; Lieutenant of the Royal Victorian Order; Officer of the Order of the British Empire; Military Cross

Brigadier Arthur Valerian Wellesley, 8th Duke of Wellington (2 July 1915 – 31 December 2014), styled Marquess of Douro between 1943 and 1972, was a British peer and army officer. His main residence was Stratfield Saye House in Hampshire.

He was a member of the House of Lords from 1972 until 1999, losing his seat by the House of Lords Act.

== Background and education ==
Wellington was born in Rome, Italy, on 2 July 1915, the son of Lord Gerald Wellesley, future 7th Duke of Wellington, by his wife Dorothy Violet (née Ashton), daughter of Robert Ashton. He had one younger sister, the socialite Lady Elizabeth Clyde, whose son is the actor and musician Jeremy Clyde.

At the time of Wellington's birth, his father Gerald was the third son of the 4th Duke of Wellington, with little prospect of succeeding to the family's estates and titles. Wellington was 28 when his first cousin Henry, the 6th Duke, was killed in action aged 31 while serving in Italy during the Second World War. Wellington's father then became the 7th Duke, and Wellington himself came to be known by the courtesy title Marquess of Douro. He was thus named between 1943 and 1972, when he became 8th Duke upon the death of his father.

Wellington attended Eton before going up to New College, Oxford.

== Military career ==
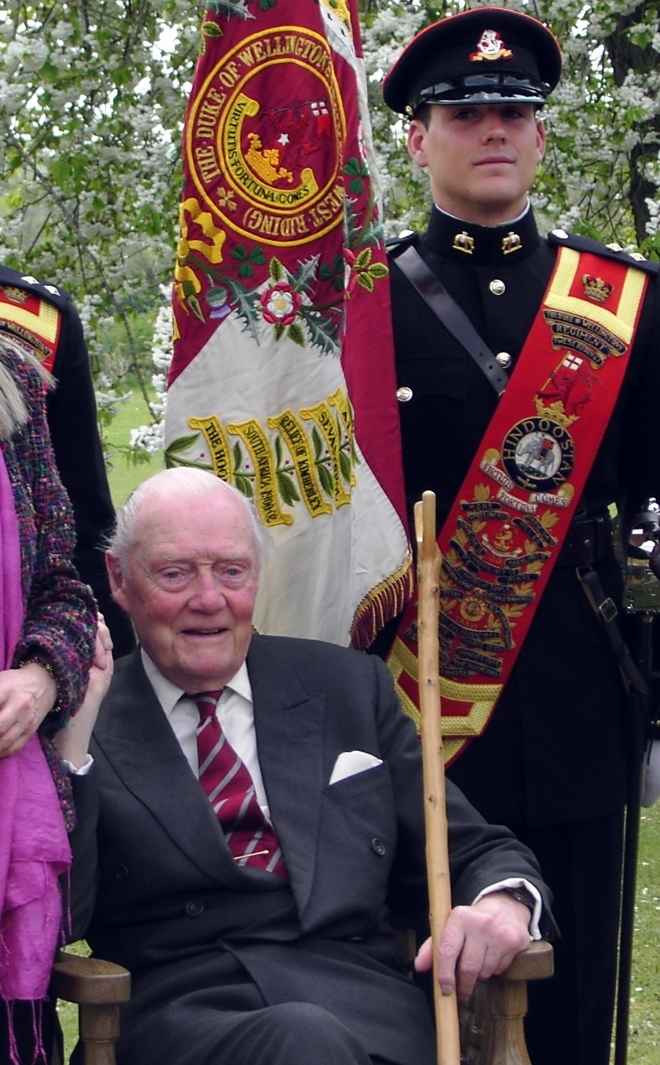
The Duke of Wellington at Battlesbury Barracks, May 2006.

Wellington was commissioned a second lieutenant in the Territorial Army in 1936, and was commissioned with the same rank (on probation) in the British Army Reserve in 1939. In 1940, he was given a full commission as a second lieutenant in the Royal Horse Guards Regiment, with the service number 68268. He served in the Second World War with the 1st Household Cavalry Regiment in the Middle East and Italy, during which time he was awarded the Military Cross, and promoted to the war substantive rank of captain. Following the war, the 1st Household Cavalry Regiment disbanded, and he returned to Royal Horse Guards, where he was promoted to lieutenant in 1946, and advanced to the rank of captain later that year. He received successive promotions to major in 1951, and to lieutenant colonel in 1954, rising to command of his regiment. Seeing service in Cyprus between 1956 and 1958, he was appointed an Officer of the Order of the British Empire in 1958.

in 1959 he became Silver Stick-in-Waiting and Lieutenant Colonel Commanding the Household Cavalry. Promoted to colonel in 1960, he commanded the 22nd Armoured Brigade (1960–1961), served as Commander, Royal Armoured Corps in the I(BR) Corps of the British Army of the Rhine, and became defence attaché to Spain in 1964. He retired from the Army in 1968 and was granted the honorary rank of brigadier.

=== Honorary appointments ===
Wellington was appointed the Colonel-in-Chief of the Duke of Wellington's Regiment in 1974, making him the only non-royal Colonel-in-Chief. After its absorption into the Yorkshire Regiment, he was appointed Deputy Colonel-in-Chief of the new regiment. He was also Deputy Colonel of The Blues and Royals and an Honorary Colonel of the 2nd Battalion, Wessex Regiment.

== Later life and death ==
Wellington was involved in business as a Director of Massey Ferguson Holdings Ltd from 1967 to 1989 and of Motor Iberica SA (Spain) from 1967 to 1999. He was appointed a Deputy Lieutenant of Hampshire on 18 April 1975. Through his final years, the Duke continued to conduct public engagements, most recently at the Order of the Garter investiture on 16 June 2014.

Wellington died peacefully at his home, Stratfield Saye Estate, near Basingstoke, in 2014, aged 99.

== Marriage and issue ==
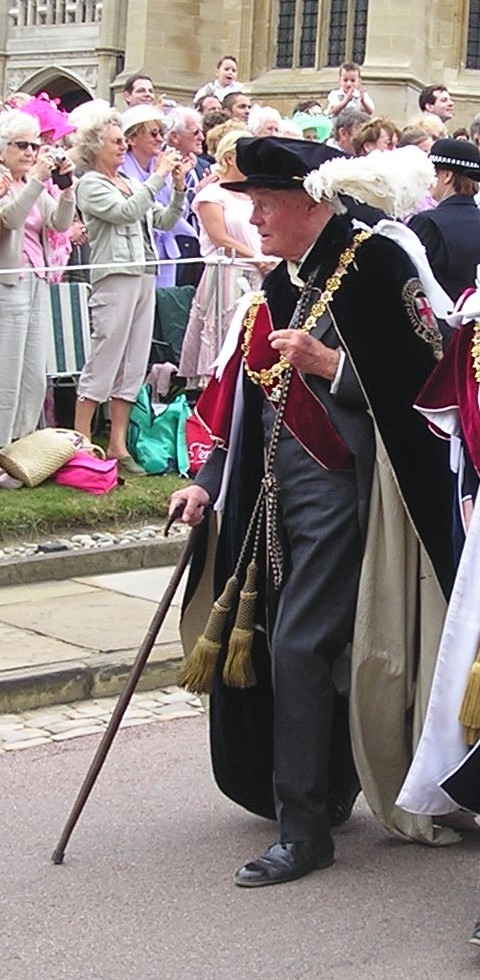
The 8th Duke of Wellington wearing his robes as a Knight Companion of the Order of the Garter at Windsor Castle (2006)

Wellington was twice engaged to Lady Rose Paget, the daughter of Charles Paget, 6th Marquess of Anglesey, who eventually married the Hon. John Francis McLaren. On 28 January 1944 he married Diana Ruth McConnel (1922–2010), only daughter of Major-General Douglas McConnel, of Knockdolian, Colmonell, Ayr, at St. George's Cathedral, Jerusalem. With Diana, he had five children:

- Arthur Charles Valerian Wellesley, 9th Duke of Wellington, 10th Duke of Ciudad Rodrigo (19 August 1945); married Princess Antonia of Prussia.
- Lord Richard Gerald Wellesley (20 June 1949); married Joanna Sumner on 14 July 1973. They have two daughters.
- Lady (Caroline) Jane Wellesley (6 July 1951)
- Lord John Henry Wellesley (20 April 1954); married Corinne Vaes, daughter of a Belgian diplomat, on 7 May 1977. They have two children. Father-in-law of singer James Blunt.
- Lord (James) Christopher Douglas Wellesley (16 December 1964); married firstly Laura Wedge in 1994, and they had one daughter before they were divorced in 2005. Emma Nethercott became his second wife; they had three children, including daughter Skye, who died aged 15 from the complications of Rett syndrome and in whose name and memory the Skye Wellesley Foundation was established. The couple divorced in February 2015.

== Titles and styles ==
He was the 9th Duke of Ciudad Rodrigo (Duque de Ciudad Rodrigo) of the Kingdom of Spain, but on 10 March 2010, he ceded the Spanish Dukedom to his eldest child, Charles Wellesley, Marquess of Douro. In accordance with Spanish procedure, Lord Douro petitioned a formal claim to the title with the Spanish authorities. King Juan Carlos of Spain, through his Minister, granted the succession of the dukedom to Douro on 21 May 2010.

== Honours and decorations ==
Arms of the Duke

Knight Companion of the Order of the Garter (KG)	April 1990
Lieutenant of the Royal Victorian Order (LVO)	1952, as Member (Fourth Class); re-designated Lieutenant in 1984
Officer of the Order of the British Empire (OBE)	1958 (Military Division)
Military Cross (MC)	1941
Officer of the Most Venerable Order of the Hospital of Saint John of Jerusalem (OStJ)	
1939–1945 Star	
Africa Star	
Italy Star	
France and Germany Star	
Defence Medal	
War Medal 1939–1945	
General Service Medal	with 'Cyprus' clasp and MID
Queen Elizabeth II Coronation Medal	1953
Queen Elizabeth II Silver Jubilee Medal	1977
Queen Elizabeth II Golden Jubilee Medal	2002
Queen Elizabeth II Diamond Jubilee Medal	2012
Knight Grand Cross of the Order of Isabella the Catholic	Spain
Officer of the Légion d'honneur	France
Knight Grand Cross of the Order of Saint Michael of the Wing	Portugal (dynastic order)

On 26 December 1941, as Second Lieutenant Wellesley, Wellesley was awarded the Military Cross "in recognition of distinguished services in the Middle East (including Egypt, East Africa, The Western Desert, The Sudan, Greece, Crete, Syria and Tobruk) during the period February, 1941, to July, 1941".

Wellington was appointed a Member (Fourth Class) of the Royal Victorian Order (MVO) on 15 March 1952. Membership (Fourth Class) was redesignated Lieutenant in 1984, thus adjusting his post-nominal letters to LVO. He was made an Officer (Military) of the Order of the British Empire (OBE) on 7 February 1958 "in recognition of distinguished services in Cyprus for the period 1st July to 31st December, 1957".

In April 1990, he was further honoured by the Queen as a Knight Companion of the Garter. His foreign honours include appointments as Officer of the Légion d'honneur, Knight Grand Cross of the Order of St. Michael of the Wing of Portugal and Knight Grand Cross of the Order of Isabel La Catolica of Spain. Wellington was also an Officer of the Most Venerable Order of the Hospital of St John of Jerusalem (OStJ).

Wellesley was elected a Fellow of King's College London (FKC).

== See also ==
- Yorkshire Regiment
- Duke of Wellington's Regiment
- 76th Regiment of Foot

== Notes ==
Peerage of the United Kingdom
Preceded by Gerald Wellesley	Duke of Wellington; 1972–2014; Member of the House of Lords (1972–1999)	Succeeded by Charles Wellesley
Peerage of Ireland
Preceded by Gerald Wellesley	Earl of Mornington; 1972–2014	Succeeded by Charles Wellesley
Dutch nobility
Preceded by Gerald Wellesley	Prince of Waterloo; 1972–2014	Succeeded by Charles Wellesley
Spanish nobility
Preceded by Gerald Wellesley	Duke of Ciudad Rodrigo; 1968–2010	Succeeded by Charles Wellesley
Portuguese nobility
Preceded by Gerald Wellesley	Duke of Victoria; 1972–2014	Succeeded by Charles Wellesley
