= Prince of Waterloo =

Title in Dutch and Belgian nobility

Prince of Waterloo Prins van Waterloo Prince de Waterloo
- Arms of the Dukes of Wellington as Prince of Waterloo.
- Creation date: 8 July 1815
- Created by: King William I
- Peerage: Dutch and Belgian nobility
- First holder: Arthur Wellesley, 1st Duke of Wellington
- Present holder: Charles Wellesley, 9th Duke of Wellington
- Heir apparent: Jonkheer Arthur Gerald Wellesley
- Remainder to: the 1st Duke's heirs male of the body lawfully begotten
- Motto: Virtutis Fortuna Comes

Prince of Waterloo (Dutch: Prins van Waterloo, French: Prince de Waterloo) is a title in the Dutch and Belgian nobility, held by the Duke of Wellington. The title was created by King William I of the Netherlands for Field Marshal Arthur Wellesley, 1st Duke of Wellington as a victory title in recognition of defeating Napoleon at the Battle of Waterloo in 1815. The Duke of Wellington and all his descendants along the male line belong to Dutch and Belgian nobility, in which all the descendant dukes carry the title of "Prince of Waterloo" with the style "Serene Highness" (Dutch: Doorluchtigheid). The rest of his family retain the Dutch honorific Jonkheer or Jonkvrouw.

== Estate of the prince ==
In addition to this title, the Dutch king also granted Wellington 1,050 hectares (2,600 acres) of land and a yearly endowment of 20,000 guilders. To this day the Dukes of Wellington retain the title Prince of Waterloo, and enjoy an annual income of around £100,000 from the longstanding tenants occupying the land.

Owing to the establishment of the separate Kingdom of Belgium in 1831, the title (being Dutch) and the land (located in Belgium) became separated. After the Belgian independence the endowment was by the Treaty of London included in the public debt to be assumed by the new Kingdom of Belgium.

The land held by the Prince of Waterloo came under pressure from retired Belgian senator Jean-Emile Humblet in 2001. In 1817, the government in what is now Belgium struck a deal to pay the duke £1,600 a year in return for the proceeds of sales of timber which the duke wanted to clear from the forested land. Until 1988, successive dukes enjoyed this annual payment, but the then Prince of Waterloo, Valerian Wellesley, 8th Duke of Wellington, agreed to forgo the payment in exchange for outright ownership of 24 ha (60 acres) of the 1,050 ha (2,600 acres) to which he has rights. But some Belgian taxpayers, led by Humblet, claimed the deal did not reflect the value of the land and drew attention to the wider issues surrounding the original agreement, contending that Belgium was effectively coerced into accepting the terms of the original agreement, because it could not afford to offend Britain.

In 2009 a Member of Parliament from Vlaams Belang questioned the Minister of Finance, Didier Reynders about the grant. Reynders replied that this grant is part of the international obligations of Belgium under the Treaty of London and that he had no intention of reneging on the obligation, as all the Dukes have faithfully fulfilled their obligations.

== List of princes of Waterloo (1815–present) ==
- Arthur Wellesley, 1st Prince of Waterloo (1769–1852) from 1815
- Arthur Wellesley, 2nd Prince of Waterloo (1807–1884) from 1852
- Henry Wellesley, 3rd Prince of Waterloo (1846–1900) from 1884
- Arthur Wellesley, 4th Prince of Waterloo (1849–1934) from 1900
- Arthur (Charlie) Wellesley, 5th Prince of Waterloo (1876–1941) from 1934
- Henry (Morney) Wellesley, 6th Prince of Waterloo (1912–1943) from 1941
- Gerald (Gerry) Wellesley, 7th Prince of Waterloo (1885–1972) from 1943
- Arthur Valerian Wellesley, 8th Prince of Waterloo (1915–2014) from 1972
- Arthur Charles Wellesley, 9th Prince of Waterloo (b. 1945) from 2014

The heir apparent is the present holder's son Jonkheer Arthur Gerald Wellesley (b. 1978).

== Family tree ==
Wellesley family tree: Dukes of Wellington, Victoria, and Ciudad Rodrigo, and Princes of Waterloo

Baron Mornington of Mornington, 1746
Richard Colley Wesley; 1690–1758; 1st Baron Mornington
Earl of Mornington and Viscount Wellesley, of Dangan Castle in the County of Meath, 1760
Richard Colley Wesley; 1735–1781; 1st Earl of Mornington, etc., 2nd Baron Mornington
Baron Wellesley of Wellesley in the County of Somerset, 1797; Marquess Wellesley of Norragh, 1799	Baron Maryborough of Maryborough in the Queen's County, 1821	Viscount Wellington (UK), 1809; Count of Vimeiro (Portugal), 1811; Marquess of Wellington (UK), 1812; Duke of Ciudad Rodrigo (Spain), 1812; Duke of Victoria and Marquess of Torres Vedras (Portugal), 1812; Duke of Wellington (UK) and Marquess Douro and Baron Douro (Portugal), 1814; Prince of Waterloo (Netherlands), 1815
Richard Wellesley; 1760–1842; Marquess Wellesley, etc., 2nd Earl of Mornington, etc., 3rd Baron Mornington	William Wellesley-Pole; 1763–1845; 3rd Earl of Mornington, etc., 4th Baron Mornington, 1st Baron Maryborough	Arthur Wellesley; 1769–1852; 1st Duke of Wellington, etc.
Marquessate Wellesley and Barony Wellesley extinct, 1842
William Pole-Tylney-Long-Wellesley; 1788–1857; 4th Earl of Mornington, etc., 5th Baron Mornington, 2nd Baron Maryborough	Arthur Richard Wellesley; 1807–1884; 2nd Duke of Wellington, etc., 6th Earl of Mornington, etc.	Lord Charles Wellesley; 1808–1858
William Pole-Tylney-Long-Wellesley; 1813–1863; 5th Earl of Mornington, etc., 6th Baron Mornington, 3rd Baron Maryborough	Henry Wellesley; 1846–1900; 3rd Duke of Wellington, etc., 7th Earl of Mornington, etc.	Arthur Charles Wellesley; 1849–1934; 4th Duke of Wellington, etc., 8th Earl of Mornington, etc.
Barony Maryborough extinct, 1863
Arthur Charles Wellesley; 1876–1941; 5th Duke of Wellington, etc., 9th Earl of Mornington, etc.	Gerald Wellesley; 1885–1972; 7th Duke of Wellington, etc., 8th Duke of Ciudad Rodrigo, 10th Earl of Mornington, etc.
Anne Rhys; 1910–1998; 7th Duchess of Ciudad Rodrigo	Henry Valerian George Wellesley; 1912–1943; 6th Duke of Wellington, etc., 11th Earl of Mornington, etc.	Arthur Valerian Wellesley; 1915–2014; 8th Duke of Wellington, etc., 9th Duke of Ciudad Rodrigo, 12th Earl of Mornington, etc.
Baron Wellington of Stratfield Saye, 2026
Arthur Charles Valerian Wellesley b. 1945; 9th Duke of Wellington, etc., 10th Duke of Ciudad Rodrigo, 13th Earl of Mornington, etc., Baron Wellington of Stratfield Saye
Arthur Gerald Wellesley styled Marquess of Douro b. 1978
Arthur Darcy Wellesley b. 2010 styled Earl of Mornington

== See also ==
- Duque de Ciudad Rodrigo
- Duque da Vitória
