= Charles Wellesley, 9th Duke of Wellington =

British peer and politician (born 1945)

His Grace The Duke of Wellington GE OBE DL

Member of the House of Lords Lord Temporal
- Incumbent
- Life peerage 1 June 2026
- Elected Hereditary Peer; 17 September 2015 – 29 April 2026
- By-election: 2015
- Preceded by: The 3rd Baron Luke
- Succeeded by: Seat abolished

Member of the European Parliament for Surrey West Surrey (1979–1984)
- In office 1979–1989
- Preceded by: Constituency established
- Succeeded by: Tom Spencer

Personal details
- Born: Arthur Charles Valerian Wellesley; 19 August 1945 (age 81) H.R.H. Princess Christian Hospital, Windsor, Berkshire, England
- Party: Crossbencher (since 2020); Conservative (until 2019)
- Spouse: Princess Antonia of Prussia (m. 1977)
- Children: 5, including Lady Mary Wellesley; Lady Charlotte Santo Domingo
- Parent(s): Valerian Wellesley, 8th Duke of Wellington; Diana McConnel
- Education: Eton College
- Alma mater: Christ Church, Oxford

Arthur Charles Valerian Wellesley, 9th Duke of Wellington, Baron Wellington of Stratfield Saye (born 19 August 1945), styled Earl of Mornington between 1945 and 1972 and Marquess of Douro between 1972 and 2014, is a British peer and politician. He served as Conservative Member of the European Parliament for Surrey (1979–1984) and Surrey West (1984–1989).

Wellington sat as an excepted hereditary peer in the House of Lords from 2015 to 2026, when the coming into force of the House of Lords (Hereditary Peers) Act 2026 excluded him from the chamber. Following a brief hiatus, on 1 June 2026 he was created Baron Wellington of Stratfield Saye, a life peerage that enabled his return to the House of Lords. As of 2026, he is the only duke sitting in the House of Lords.

== Early life and education ==
Arthur Charles Valerian Wellesley was born on 19 August 1945 at H.R.H. Princess Christian Hospital in Windsor, Berkshire, the first son of Valerian Wellesley, 8th Duke of Wellington and Diana McConnel. He grew up in London and at Stratfield Saye House, his family's estate in Hampshire, and was educated at Ludgrove School, Eton College and Christ Church, Oxford.

== Politics ==
Wellington stood as Conservative Party candidate for Islington North in 1974, losing to Labour's incumbent Michael O'Halloran. He was a member of Basingstoke Borough Council from 1978 to 1979. He subsequently served as Conservative MEP for Surrey from 1979 to 1984, and as Conservative MEP for Surrey West from 1984 to 1989.

In September 2015, he was elected to a seat in the House of Lords as a Conservative in a by-election following the retirement of Lord Luke. On 4 September 2019, he quit the Conservative Party. He sat as a "non-affiliated" member of the House of Lords from September 2019 to September 2020. Since September 2020 he has sat as a crossbench peer.

In 2021, he put forward an amendment to the Environment Bill to attempt to reduce pollution from the dumping of sewage in rivers. The initial amendment was rejected by MPs, which led to a backlash on social media. The Environment Secretary George Eustice proposed making measures a legal duty, but Wellington put forward the amendment again to attempt to ensure changes came into force.

== Courtier ==
He carried Queen Mary's Crown in the royal procession at the coronation of Charles III and Camilla. With the Duchess, he was invited to ride in the King's procession at Royal Ascot 2023.

Wellington has a ground-floor apartment at Apsley House, Hyde Park Corner, the Westminster townhouse of the Dukes of Wellington.

== Voluntary work ==
Wellington has worked for a number of non-profit or charitable organisations. He was a patron of British Art at the Tate Gallery, 1987–1990, a member of the Royal College of Art between 1992 and 1997, Chairman of British-Spanish Tertulias, 1993 to 1998, and Trustee of the Phoenix Trust from 1996 to 2001. He was appointed OBE in 1999 for services to British-Spanish business relations. He was appointed a Deputy Lord-Lieutenant of Hampshire in 1999. In 2003 he was given a four-year appointment as a Commissioner for English Heritage.

On 1 October 2007, he became Chairman of the Governing Council of King's College London, an institution of which his wife Princess Antonia is an alumna, and of which his ancestor Arthur Wellesley, 1st Duke of Wellington, was instrumental in the foundation.

In February 2025, Wellington participated in the Purdey Awards for Game and Conservation, held at Audley House in Mayfair. He chaired the judging panel, which included representatives from the shooting and conservation sectors. The event, marking its 25th anniversary, was co-hosted by Charles Gordon-Lennox, 11th Duke of Richmond, who presented the awards.

== Marriage ==
Charles married Princess Antonia of Prussia on 3 February 1977 at St Paul's Church, Knightsbridge, London. Notable guests at the wedding included Queen Elizabeth the Queen Mother, Charles, Prince of Wales (later King Charles III), Princess Margaret, Countess of Snowdon, and the Duke and Duchess of Kent. The couple are friends of King Charles III and Queen Camilla.

They have five children:

- Arthur Wellesley, Marquess of Douro (born 31 January 1978); was married (4 June 2005 – August 2020) to former model, now make-up artist Jemma Kidd (born 20 September 1974), fashion stylist and great-granddaughter of Max Aitken, 1st Baron Beaverbrook; they have issue two sons and a daughter. In December 2022, he remarried to Hayley Whitehead and they share a son.
- Lady Honor Victoria Wellesley (born 25 October 1979); married 3 July 2004 (as his second wife) the Honourable Orlando Montagu, younger son of John Montagu, 11th Earl of Sandwich, and had issue.
- Lady Mary Luise Wellesley (born 16 December 1986), a goddaughter of Diana, Princess of Wales.
- Lady Charlotte Anne Wellesley (born 8 October 1990); who attended Oxford University reading archaeology and anthropology. Her day job is at photographer Mario Testino's studio in London, where she is a producer. On 15 July 2015, her engagement was announced to Colombian billionaire Alejandro Santo Domingo, uncle of Tatiana Santo Domingo, wife of Andrea Casiraghi. They married in the duke's family estate Dehesa Baja in Spain, on 28 May 2016, after the ceremony at the sixteenth-century Church of the Incarnation in Illora, near Granada.
- Lord Frederick Charles Wellesley (born 30 September 1992), a godson of King Charles III. He attended Eton College. Gained a commission into the Household Cavalry (Blues and Royals) from The Royal Military Academy Sandhurst in December 2016. His engagement to Captain Katherine Lambert RE, was announced on 25 February 2021. They married on 31 July 2021.

== Titles and styles ==
Apart from his British titles, the Duke of Wellington also holds the hereditary titles of His Serene Highness 9th Prince of Waterloo ("Prins van Waterloo") of both the Kingdom of the Netherlands and the Kingdom of Belgium, and 9th Duke of Victoria ("Duque da Vitória") of the Kingdom of Portugal with its subsidiary titles Marquis of Torres Vedras ("Marquês de Torres Vedras") and Count of Vimeiro ("Conde de Vimeiro"). These were granted to the first Duke as victory titles for his distinguished services as victorious commanding general in the Peninsular War (in Spain and Portugal), and at the Battle of Waterloo (in what is now Belgium).

Wellington is also the 10th Duke of Ciudad Rodrigo ("Duque de Ciudad Rodrigo") of the Kingdom of Spain, which on 10 March 2010 was ceded to him by his father. In accordance with Spanish procedure, Wellington (then styled as Marquess of Douro) made a formal claim to the title with the Spanish Ministry of Justice. King Juan Carlos I of Spain, through his minister, granted the succession to the dukedom of Ciudad Rodrigo to Wellington in May 2010.

On 13 May 2026, it was announced that a life peerage would be conferred on him as part of the 2026 political peerages. On 1 June 2026, he was created Baron Wellington of Stratfield Saye, of Stratfield Saye in the County of Hampshire and of Colmonell in the County of Ayrshire. Later that same day he resumed his seat in the Lords.

Orders of precedence in the United Kingdom
Preceded by The Duke of Leinster	Duke; The Duke of Wellington	Succeeded by The Duke of Sutherland
Peerage of the United Kingdom
Preceded by Valerian Wellesley	Duke of Wellington; 2014–present	Incumbent
Peerage of Ireland
Preceded by Valerian Wellesley	Earl of Mornington; 2014–present	Incumbent
Dutch nobility
Preceded by Valerian Wellesley	Prince of Waterloo; 2014–present	Incumbent
Belgian nobility
Preceded by Valerian Wellesley	Prince of Waterloo; 2014–present	Incumbent
Spanish nobility
Preceded by Valerian Wellesley	Duke of Ciudad Rodrigo; 2010–present	Incumbent
Portuguese nobility
Preceded by Valerian Wellesley	Duke of Victoria; 2014–present	Incumbent
Parliament of the United Kingdom
Preceded by The Lord Luke	Elected hereditary peer to the House of Lords under the House of Lords Act 1999; 2015–2026	Position abolished under the House of Lords (Hereditary Peers) Act 2026
Academic offices
Preceded by The Baroness Rawlings	Chairman of King's College London; 2007–2016	Succeeded by The Lord Geidt
