= Duke of Victoria =

Portuguese title of nobility

Dukedom of Victoria
- Arms of the Dukes of Wellington as Duke of Victoria.
- Creation date: 18 December 1812
- Created by: Prince Regent John of Portugal (later King John VI)
- Peerage: Peerage of Portugal
- First holder: Arthur Wellesley, 1st Marquess of Wellington
- Present holder: Charles Wellesley, 9th Duke of Wellington
- Heir apparent: Arthur Wellesley, Earl of Mornington
- Remainder to: the 1st Duke's heirs male of the body lawfully begotten
- Subsidiary titles: Marquess of Torres Vedras; Count of Vimeiro

Duke of Victoria (Portuguese: Duque da Vitória, lit. 'Victorious Duke, or Duke of Victory') is a Portuguese title of nobility retained by the Duke of Wellington.

The title was created by Prince Regent John of Portugal (later King John VI) on 18 December 1812 to honour the British General Arthur Wellesley, who commanded the armies that eventually defeated the troops of Emperor Napoleon I of France in the Peninsular War. It was the only grant of a Portuguese dukedom to a foreigner.

Arthur Wellesley had already received the Portuguese titles Conde de Vimeiro (Count of Vimeiro, 18 October 1811) and Marquês de Torres Vedras (Marquess of Torres Vedras, 17 December 1812), which became titles subsidiary to that of Duque da Vitória. He also received the British peerage title Duke of Wellington, and other titles and honours from the United Kingdom, Spain, and the Netherlands. All these titles have been passed to his heirs to the present day.

== Dukes of Victoria since 1812 ==
- Arthur Wellesley, 1st Duke of Victoria (1769–1852) from 1812
- Arthur Richard Wellesley, 2nd Duke of Victoria (1807–1884) from 1852
- Henry Wellesley, 3rd Duke of Victoria (1846–1900) from 1884
- Arthur Charles Wellesley, 4th Duke of Victoria (1849–1934) from 1900 until 1934
- Arthur Charles Wellesley, 5th Duke of Victoria (1876–1941) from 1934
- Henry Valerian George Wellesley, 6th Duke of Victoria (1912–1943) from 1941
- Gerald Wellesley, 7th Duke of Victoria (1885–1972) from 1943
- Arthur Valerian Wellesley, 8th Duke of Victoria (1915–2014) from 1972
- Arthur Charles Valerian Wellesley, 9th Duke of Victoria (b. 1945) since 2014

The heir apparent is the present holder's son Arthur Wellesley, Marquess of Douro, whose heir apparent is his son Arthur Darcy Wellesley.

== Family tree ==
Wellesley family tree: Dukes of Wellington, Victoria, and Ciudad Rodrigo, and Princes of Waterloo

Baron Mornington of Mornington, 1746
Richard Colley Wesley; 1690–1758; 1st Baron Mornington
Earl of Mornington and Viscount Wellesley, of Dangan Castle in the County of Meath, 1760
Richard Colley Wesley; 1735–1781; 1st Earl of Mornington, etc., 2nd Baron Mornington
Baron Wellesley of Wellesley in the County of Somerset, 1797; Marquess Wellesley of Norragh, 1799	Baron Maryborough of Maryborough in the Queen's County, 1821	Viscount Wellington (UK), 1809; Count of Vimeiro (Portugal), 1811; Marquess of Wellington (UK), 1812; Duke of Ciudad Rodrigo (Spain), 1812; Duke of Victoria and Marquess of Torres Vedras (Portugal), 1812; Duke of Wellington (UK) and Marquess Douro and Baron Douro (Portugal), 1814; Prince of Waterloo (Netherlands), 1815
Richard Wellesley; 1760–1842; Marquess Wellesley, etc., 2nd Earl of Mornington, etc., 3rd Baron Mornington	William Wellesley-Pole; 1763–1845; 3rd Earl of Mornington, etc., 4th Baron Mornington, 1st Baron Maryborough	Arthur Wellesley; 1769–1852; 1st Duke of Wellington, etc.
Marquessate Wellesley and Barony Wellesley extinct, 1842
William Pole-Tylney-Long-Wellesley; 1788–1857; 4th Earl of Mornington, etc., 5th Baron Mornington, 2nd Baron Maryborough	Arthur Richard Wellesley; 1807–1884; 2nd Duke of Wellington, etc., 6th Earl of Mornington, etc.	Lord Charles Wellesley; 1808–1858
William Pole-Tylney-Long-Wellesley; 1813–1863; 5th Earl of Mornington, etc., 6th Baron Mornington, 3rd Baron Maryborough	Henry Wellesley; 1846–1900; 3rd Duke of Wellington, etc., 7th Earl of Mornington, etc.	Arthur Charles Wellesley; 1849–1934; 4th Duke of Wellington, etc., 8th Earl of Mornington, etc.
Barony Maryborough extinct, 1863
Arthur Charles Wellesley; 1876–1941; 5th Duke of Wellington, etc., 9th Earl of Mornington, etc.	Gerald Wellesley; 1885–1972; 7th Duke of Wellington, etc., 8th Duke of Ciudad Rodrigo, 10th Earl of Mornington, etc.
Anne Rhys; 1910–1998; 7th Duchess of Ciudad Rodrigo	Henry Valerian George Wellesley; 1912–1943; 6th Duke of Wellington, etc., 11th Earl of Mornington, etc.	Arthur Valerian Wellesley; 1915–2014; 8th Duke of Wellington, etc., 9th Duke of Ciudad Rodrigo, 12th Earl of Mornington, etc.
Baron Wellington of Stratfield Saye, 2026
Arthur Charles Valerian Wellesley b. 1945; 9th Duke of Wellington, etc., 10th Duke of Ciudad Rodrigo, 13th Earl of Mornington, etc., Baron Wellington of Stratfield Saye
Arthur Gerald Wellesley styled Marquess of Douro b. 1978
Arthur Darcy Wellesley b. 2010 styled Earl of Mornington

== Use of titles of nobility in the Portuguese Republic ==
With the end of the Portuguese monarchy in 1910, all titles of Portuguese nobility were initially abolished. Notwithstanding, although the status of nobility has not been recognised in law since 1910, legitimate titles of nobility (those granted by a reigning monarch before 5 October 1910) have been given legal recognition and protection, including under article 26 of the Portuguese Constitution, in conjunction with articles 70 and 72 of the Civil Code, as established by decision of Portugal's Supreme Court of Justice in 2014.

== See also ==
- Prins van Waterloo
- Duque de Ciudad Rodrigo
