= Arthur Wellesley, 2nd Duke of Wellington =

British soldier and politician (1807–1884)

Lieutenant-General His Grace The Duke of Wellington KG PC
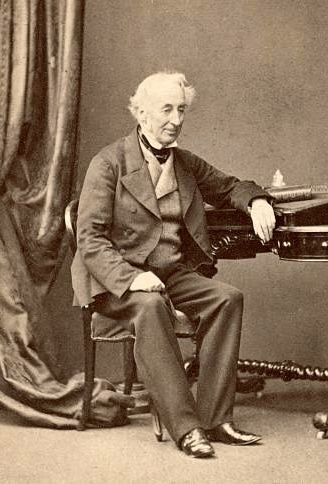
- The Duke of Wellington, c. 1870

Master of the Horse
- In office 21 January 1853 – 21 February 1858
- Monarch: Queen Victoria
- Prime Minister: The Earl of Aberdeen; The Viscount Palmerston
- Preceded by: The Earl of Jersey
- Succeeded by: The Duke of Beaufort

Member of the House of Lords Lord Temporal
- In office 14 September 1852 – 13 August 1884; Hereditary Peerage
- Preceded by: The 1st Duke of Wellington
- Succeeded by: The 3rd Duke of Wellington

Member of Parliament for Norwich
- In office 24 July 1837 – 7 July 1852
- Preceded by: William Murray
- Succeeded by: Edward Warner

Member of Parliament for Aldeburgh
- In office May 1829 – 8 December 1832
- Preceded by: Wyndham Lewis
- Succeeded by: Constituency abolished

Personal details
- Born: 3 February 1807 Harley Street, Soho, London, England
- Died: 13 August 1884 (aged 77) Brighton railway station, Brighton, Sussex
- Spouse: Lady Elizabeth Hay (m. 1839)
- Parent(s): Arthur Wellesley, 1st Duke of Wellington; Hon. Catherine Pakenham
- Education: Christ Church, Oxford; Trinity College, Cambridge

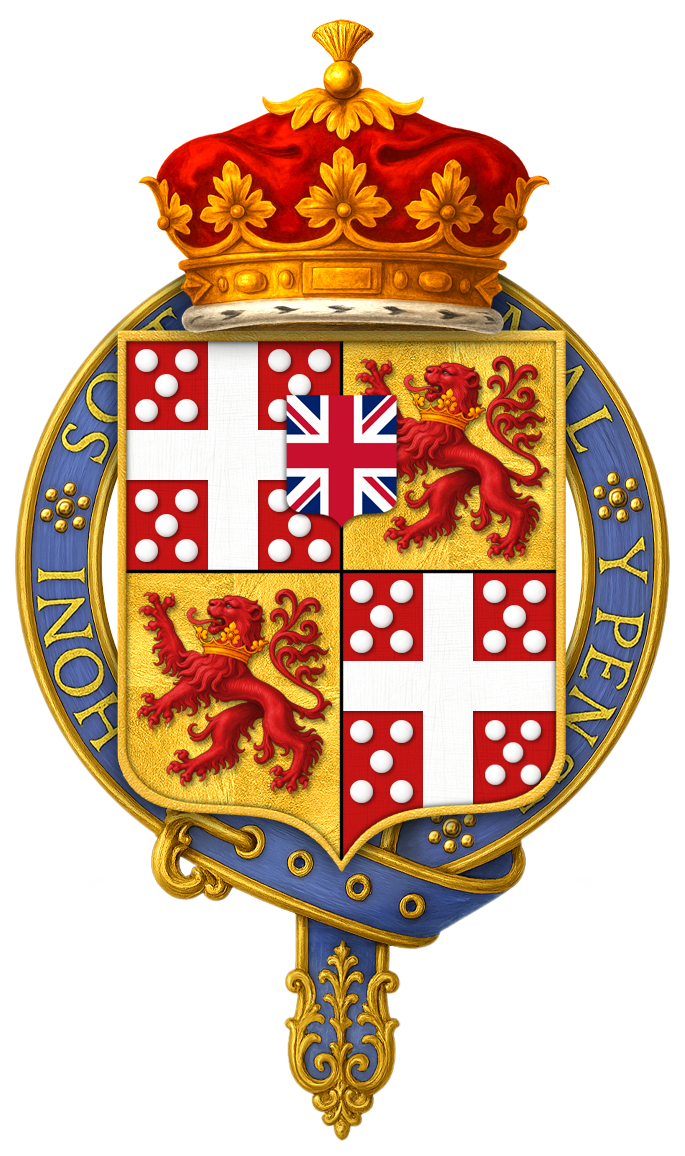
Quartered arms of Arthur Wellesley, 2nd Duke of Wellington, KG, PC

Lieutenant-General Arthur Richard Wellesley, 2nd Duke of Wellington, KG, PC (3 February 1807 – 13 August 1884), styled Lord Douro between 1812 and 1814 and Marquess of Douro between 1814 and 1852, was a British soldier and politician. The eldest son of Arthur Wellesley, 1st Duke of Wellington, victor of Waterloo and Prime Minister, he succeeded his father in the dukedom in 1852 and held minor political office as Master of the Horse from 1853 to 1858. In 1858, he was made a Knight of the Garter.

== Background and education ==
Wellesley was born at Harley Street, Marylebone, London, the eldest son of Arthur Wellesley, 1st Duke of Wellington, and the Honourable Catherine Sarah Dorothea "Kitty" Pakenham, daughter of Edward Pakenham, 2nd Baron Longford. Lord Charles Wellesley was his younger brother and Lord Wellesley, Lord Mornington and Lord Cowley his uncles. He was educated at Temple Grove School, Eton College, Christ Church, Oxford, and Trinity College, Cambridge. He became known by the courtesy title Lord Douro when his father was created Earl of Wellington in 1812 and as Marquess of Douro in 1814 after his father was elevated to a dukedom.

== Military career ==
Lord Douro became an ensign in the 81st Regiment of Foot in 1823 and in the 71st (Highland) Regiment of Foot in 1825, a cornet in the Royal Horse Guards in 1825, a lieutenant in the Royal Horse Guards in 1827, a captain in the Royal Horse Guards in 1828 and in the King's Royal Rifle Corps the same year, a major in the King's Royal Rifle Corps in 1830 and in the Rifle Brigade in 1831, a lieutenant-colonel on the unattached list in 1834, a brevet colonel in 1846, a lieutenant-colonel in the Victoria (Middlesex) Rifle Volunteer Corps in 1853 and a major-general in 1854.

Wellesley was known as one of the foremost advocates of the Volunteer movement, and served as lieutenant-colonel of one of the earliest of the volunteer rifle corps, the Victoria Rifles (Middlesex).

== Political career ==
Lord Douro was elected to Parliament for the rotten borough of Aldeburgh in 1829, a seat he held until its abolition by the Reform Act 1832. He was out of Parliament until 1837, when he was returned for Norwich. In 1852 he succeeded his father in the dukedom and entered the House of Lords. In early 1853 he was sworn of the Privy Council and appointed Master of the Horse in Lord Aberdeen's coalition government, a post he retained when Lord Palmerston became prime minister in 1855. He resigned along with the rest of the Palmerston government in 1858. The latter year he was made a Knight of the Garter.

In 1863, Wellington inherited the earldom of Mornington on the death of his cousin William Pole-Tylney-Long-Wellesley, 5th Earl of Mornington. From 1868 to 1884 he was Lord-Lieutenant of Middlesex.

== Family and personal legacy ==
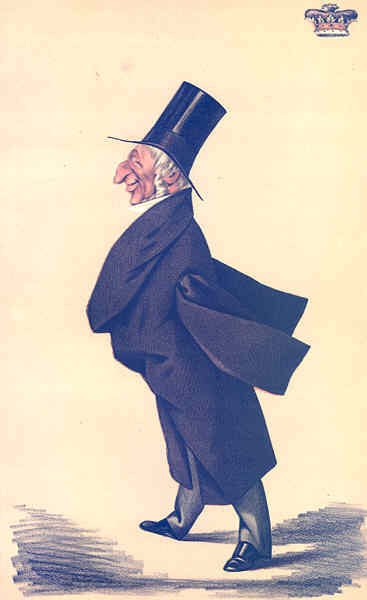
"The son of Waterloo". Caricature by Cecioni published in Vanity Fair in 1872

Wellington married Lady Elizabeth Hay, daughter of Field Marshal George Hay, 8th Marquess of Tweeddale, in 1839. They had no children. The marriage was not a happy one although Lady Elizabeth was a great favourite with her father-in-law. On succeeding his illustrious father he was said to have remarked: "Imagine what it will be when the Duke of Wellington is announced, and only I walk in the room." The relationship between father and son is often described as the classic case of the son of a famous father who cannot match such fame. Wellington died at Brighton railway station, Brighton, Sussex, in August 1884, aged 77, and was buried at the family seat Stratfield Saye House, Hampshire. His probate was resworn six years later at £171,356 (equivalent to about £18,400,000 in 2025). He was succeeded by his nephew, Henry. The Duchess died at Bearhill (Burhill) Park (House), Hersham, Surrey, in August 1904, aged 83, and was buried at Stratfield Saye. Her probate left assets of £13,997.

He owned 19,000 acres (7,700 ha) of these 15,000 acres (6,100 ha) in Hampshire.

== In literature ==
The Brontë family portrayed the first Duke of Wellington and his two sons in their imaginary games about the colonisation of Africa. They wrote many stories about Arthur, with Charlotte assuming the character of Charles as the "author" of these stories. As Charlotte and Branwell moved into their teenage years and used Lord Byron's writings as inspiration, they focused on Arthur as a romantic, heroic figure. He was known to them as the Duke of Zamorna, and later as Emperor Adrian of Angria. Elements of his character formed the basis for Edward Rochester in Jane Eyre.

Thomas Raikes ("the Younger"), a British merchant banker, dandy and diarist, was a close childhood friend, travelling and gambling companion of Arthur Wellesley, 2nd Duke of Wellington. His journals Two volumes of Private Correspondence with the 2nd Duke of Wellington and other Distinguished Contemporaries were published in 1861.

== Styles ==
- 3 February 1807 – 26 August 1809: Arthur Richard Wellesley, Esq.
- 26 August 1809 – 28 February 1812: Hon. Arthur Richard Wellesley, Esq.
- 28 February 1812 – 3 May 1814: Lord Douro
- 3 May 1814 – 14 September 1852: Marquess of Douro
- 14 September 1852 – 7 February 1853: His Grace The Duke of Wellington
- 7 February 1853 – 25 March 1858: His Grace The Duke of Wellington PC
- 25 March 1858 – 13 August 1884: His Grace The Duke of Wellington KG, PC

His obituary gives the Duke's name and title as:

Arthur Richard Wellesley, KG., Duke and Marquis of Wellington (Somerset), Marquis of Douro, Earl of Wellington (Somerset), Viscount Wellington of Talavera and of Wellington, and Baron Douro of Wellesley, both in the same county, in the Peerage of the United Kingdom; Earl of Mornington, Viscount Wellesley of Daugan Castle, and Baron Mornington, of Mornington, county Meath, in the Peerage of Ireland; Prince of Waterloo in the Netherlands, Duke of Ciudad Rodrigo, and a Grandee of Spain of the 1st Class, Duke of Vittoria, Marquis of Torres Vedras, and Count Vimiera, in Portugal.

Parliament of the United Kingdom
Preceded by Wyndham Lewis; Joshua Walker	Member of Parliament for Aldeburgh; 1829–1832; With: Joshua Walker 1829; Spencer Kilderbee 1829–1830; John Croker 1830–1832	Constituency abolished
Preceded by Viscount Stormont; Robert Scarlet	Member of Parliament for Norwich; 1837–1852; With: Robert Scarlet 1835–1838; Benjamin Smith 1838–1847; Morton Peto 1847–1854	Succeeded by Sir Samuel Peto; Edward Warner
Political offices
Preceded by The Earl of Jersey	Master of the Horse; 1853–1858	Succeeded by The Duke of Beaufort
Honorary titles
Preceded by The Marquess of Salisbury	Lord Lieutenant of Middlesex; 1868–1884	Succeeded by Viscount Enfield
Peerage of the United Kingdom
Preceded by Arthur Wellesley	Duke of Wellington; 1852–1884	Succeeded by Henry Wellesley
Peerage of Ireland
Preceded by William Pole-Tylney-Long-Wellesley	Earl of Mornington; 1863–1884	Succeeded by Henry Wellesley
Dutch nobility
Preceded by Arthur Wellesley	Prince of Waterloo; 1852–1884	Succeeded by Henry Wellesley
Spanish nobility
Preceded by Arthur Wellesley	Duke of Ciudad Rodrigo; 1852–1884	Succeeded by Henry Wellesley
Portuguese nobility
Preceded by Arthur Wellesley	Duke of Victoria; 1852–1884	Succeeded by Henry Wellesley
