= Lady Jane Wellesley =

British television producer and writer

Lady Caroline Jane Wellesley (born 6 July 1951) is a British television producer and writer. She is the daughter of Valerian, 8th Duke of Wellington.

== Early life ==
Wellesley was born on 6 July 1951, she is the third child and only daughter of Valerian, Marquess of Douro, later 8th Duke of Wellington, and Diana McConnel. Through her father, she is a direct descendant of the 1st Duke of Wellington. She was raised in London and at Stratfield Saye House, the family's seat in Hampshire.

She dated the Prince of Wales (later King Charles III) in the early 1970s.

== Career ==
Wellesley began her career working for Apollo magazine and P. & D. Colnaghi & Co. In 1975, her television production career began with a position at Radio Times and subsequently the BBC and Granada Studios. She became in independent producer in the 1980s, running Antelope Films and Warner Sisters Film and TV. In 1987, she produced the documentary The Riddle of Midnight with novelist Salman Rushdie. Her other production credits include A Village Affair (1995) and Lady Audley's Secret (2000).

Wellesley was a close friend of American journalist Marie Colvin who was killed in an attack by Syrian government forces while she was covering the siege of Homs for The Sunday Times. In Colvin's honour, she was a co-founder of the Marie Colvin Journalists’ Network.

In 2008, Wellesley published her first work on her family history, Wellington: A Journey Through My Family. She updated and released the book in 2015 for the bicentennial of the Battle of Waterloo. In 2023, she published Blue Eyes and a Wild Spirit: A Life of Dorothy Wellesley, a biography of her paternal grandmother, Dorothy, Duchess of Wellington.

== Bibliography ==
- Wellington: A Journey Through My Family. London: Weidenfeld & Nicolson, 2008. Hardcover: ISBN 9780297852315
- Blue Eyes and a Wild Spirit: A Life of Dorothy Wellesley. Sheffield: Sandstone Press, 2023. Hardcover: ISBN 9781914518232
