= Waterloo ceremony =

The Waterloo ceremony is an annual event in which the Duke of Wellington pays a symbolic rent for his residence to the reigning monarch. The ceremony takes place at Windsor Castle each year on 18 June, which is the anniversary of the Battle of Waterloo.

== Background ==
Stratfield Saye House in Hampshire was bought by the people of the United Kingdom in 1817 for Arthur Wellesley, 1st Duke of Wellington. It was a gift to him from the nation for winning the Battle of Waterloo and defeating Napoleon. Every year, the current Duke of Wellington pays the symbolic rent to the reigning monarch in the form of a flag.

In a similar manner, the current Duke of Marlborough presents the monarch with a copy of a French royal banner every year at Windsor Castle in lieu of rent for Blenheim Palace. This is done around the anniversary of the Battle of Blenheim on 13 August.

== The ceremony ==
A silk French tricolour, with gold embroidery and imprinted with the year of presentation upon it, is handed to the monarch by the Duke of Wellington. A new flag is produced each year.

After the monarch is presented with the flag, it is taken by the Castle Superintendent to the Guard Chamber and is placed above a bust of the first Duke of Wellington.

== See also ==
- Quit Rents ceremonies
