= St Mary and St George Church, High Wycombe =

- St Mary and St George Church, High Wycombe
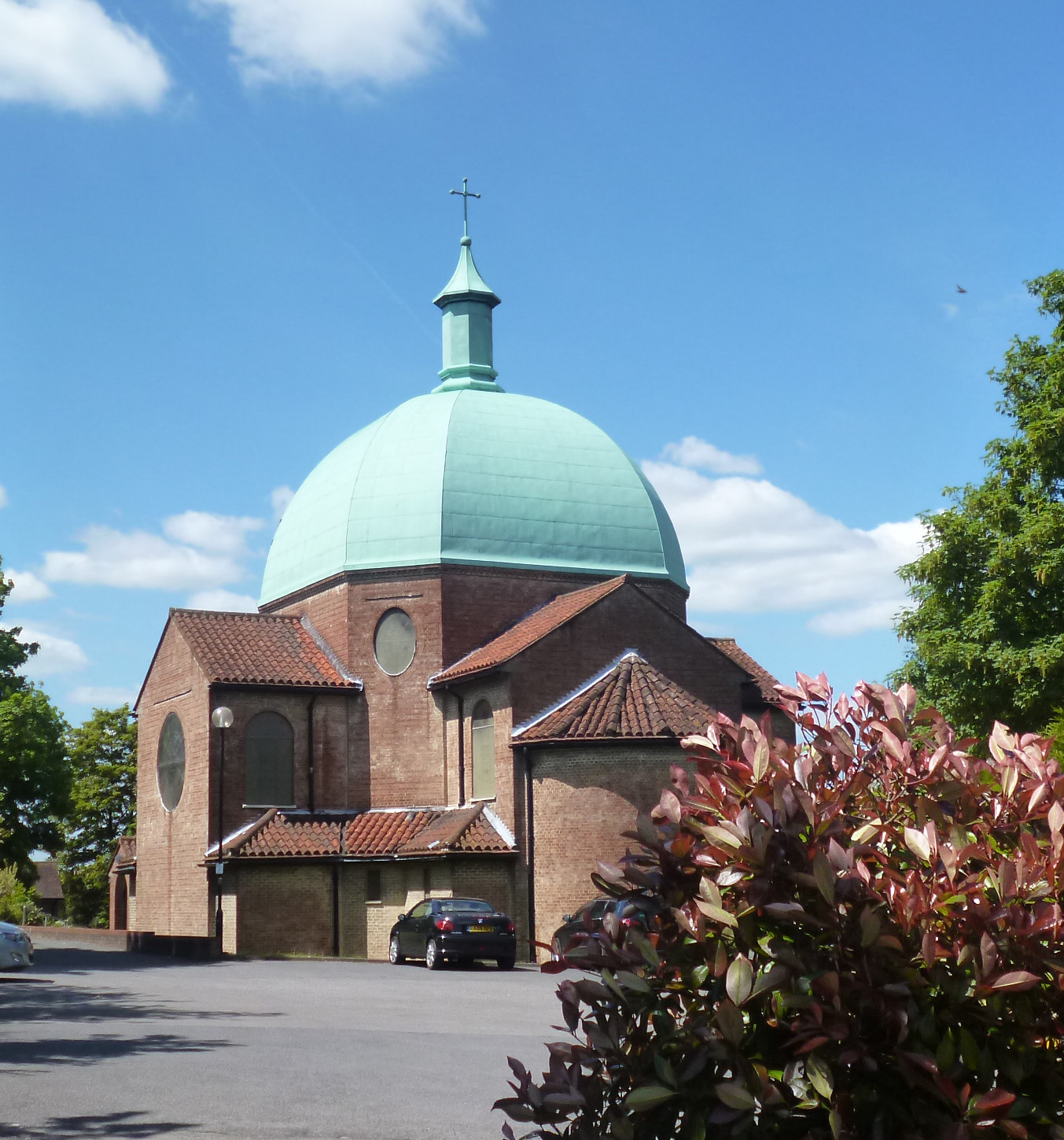

- Location of St Mary and St George in Buckinghamshire
- 51°37′58.28″N 0°46′39.71″W
- Location: Sands and Castlefield, near West Wycombe
- Country: England
- Denomination: Church of England
- Website: smgchurch.co.uk

History
- Dedication: St Mary and St George
- Consecrated: 1938

Architecture
- Heritage designation: Grade II listed church
- Designated: 28 June 1973
- Architect(s): Gerald Wellesley, 7th Duke of Wellington and Trenwith Wills
- Architectural type: Textured red brick, copper-covered dome
- Style: Free Byzantine
- Completed: 1938

Specifications
- Materials: Red brick, copper, cement

Administration
- Diocese: Diocese of Oxford
- Archdeaconry: Buckingham
- Deanery: Wycombe Deanery

St Mary and St George Church (SMG), High Wycombe is a free Byzantine style Grade II listed church, and is situated in the Diocese of Oxford. The church is notable because of its green copper dome which is considered a landmark in High Wycombe.

== History ==
The church was built in 1935–1938 by Gerald Wellesley, 7th Duke of Wellington and Trenwith Wills. It is Grade II Listed.

St Mary & St George has been a centre of Anglo-Catholic worship for most of its history and this is reflected in its architecture.

More recently the church was the recipient of a parish revitalisation initiative which saw the introduction of contemporary expressions of worship influenced by the Charismatic and Evangelical traditions within the Church of England.

The newer adjacent church hall is leased to an adult additional-needs charity.

== Today ==
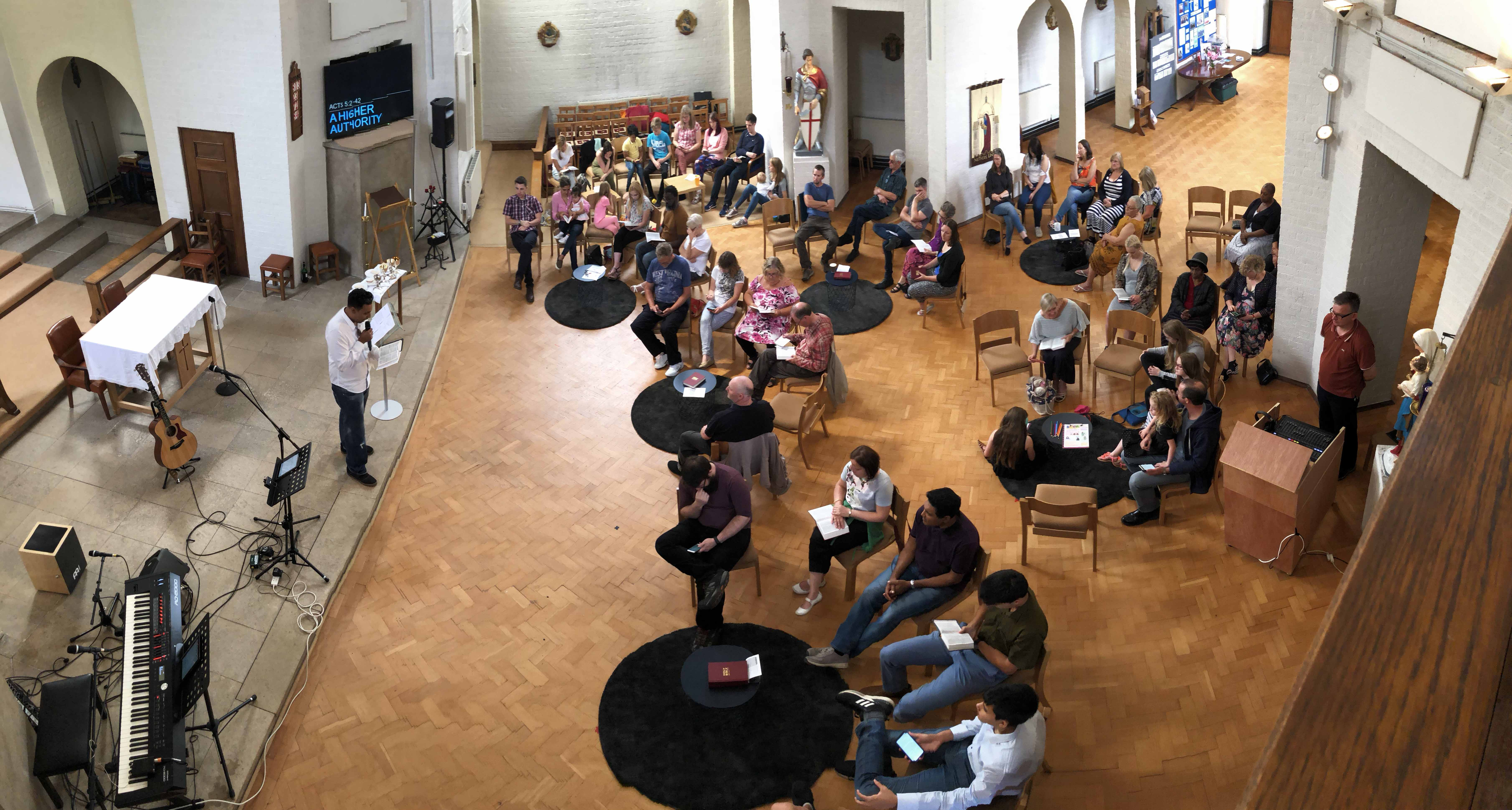
A contemporary service at St Mary and St George Church

In 2015 the PCC of St Mary & St George entered into an agreement with the PCC of St Andrew's Church, Hatters Lane, which would see a 'church planting team' sent across to establish a new worshipping community and help to revitalise the ministry and mission of the church.

In 2018, Revd. Jonny Dade was licensed by the Bishop of Buckingham as the Pioneer Minister to St Mary & St George (SMG) with a remit to lead 30 adults and children to plant a new congregation in SMG. The project was supported by the Diocese of Oxford, the Wycombe Deanery and New Wine. In March 2019 the new congregation was launched.

'SMG Church' as it is colloquially known is a community of all ages and with a focus on connecting with its parish area of Sands & Castlefield, which is an ethnically and culturally diverse community and one of the most economically deprived in the county.

The worshipping style of the church is varied, with a traditional Eucharistic service alongside a newer contemporary family gathering with children's ministry. The church is part of the New Wine network.
