= Duke of Ciudad Rodrigo =

Dukedom of Spain

Dukedom of Ciudad Rodrigo
- Creation date: 30 January 1812
- Created by: Ferdinand VII
- Peerage: Peerage of Spain
- First holder: Arthur Wellesley, 1st Duke of Ciudad Rodrigo
- Present holder: Charles Wellesley, 10th Duke of Ciudad Rodrigo
- Heir apparent: Arthur Wellesley, Earl of Mornington
- Subsidiary titles: Duke of Wellington
- Motto: Virtutis Fortuna Comes

Duke of Ciudad Rodrigo (Spanish: Duque de Ciudad Rodrigo) is a hereditary title in the Peerage of Spain, accompanied by the dignity of Grandee. It was conferred by King Ferdinand VII on the British General Arthur Wellesley, then 1st Viscount Wellington, later 1st Duke of Wellington, in 1812, after his important victory at the Siege of Ciudad Rodrigo that same year, as a victory title. As all dukedoms but one in the peerage of Spain, (Note: With the exception of the Dukedom of Fernandina.) it has Grandeeship attached.

== History ==
Historically, this Spanish dukedom is held by the successors of the 1st Duke of Wellington holding the title of Duke of Wellington, although this has not always been the case because of different succession laws. Traditionally, when titles were created, the first holder could determine how their title would pass: in the United Kingdom, almost all ducal titles were created with agnatic primogeniture, while Spanish titles usually passed either by male primogeniture or by agnatic primogeniture. This changed with the 2006 reform to Spanish nobility succession, which enforced succession by absolute primogeniture to all titles.

In 1943, Anne Rhys (née Wellesley), the only daughter and eldest child of Arthur Wellesley, 5th Duke of Wellington, inherited the Spanish dukedom but not the British titles of her family, which passed to her uncle Gerald Wellesley, 7th Duke of Wellington after her younger brother was killed in action during the Second World War. In 1949 Anne renounced the title in favour of her uncle.

In 2010, The 8th Duke of Wellington & 9th Duke of Ciudad Rodrigo ceded the Spanish dukedom to his eldest child, Charles Wellesley, Marquess of Douro, who, in accordance with Spanish procedure, made formal claim to the title with the Spanish authorities on 10 March 2010. King Juan Carlos of Spain, through his minister, granted the succession of the dukedom to the Marquess of Douro by Royal Decree of 21 May 2010. The new Duke of Ciudad Rodrigo succeeded his father as Duke of Wellington in 2014.

Arms of the Dukes of Wellington as Dukes of Ciudad Rodrigo

== Dukes of Ciudad Rodrigo since 1812 ==
- Arthur Wellesley, 1st Duke of Ciudad Rodrigo (1769–1852) from 1812
- Arthur Wellesley, 2nd Duke of Ciudad Rodrigo (1807–1884) from 1852
- Henry Wellesley, 3rd Duke of Ciudad Rodrigo (1846–1900) from 1884
- Arthur Wellesley, 4th Duke of Ciudad Rodrigo (1849–1934) from 1900
- Arthur (Charlie) Wellesley, 5th Duke of Ciudad Rodrigo (1876–1941) from 1934
- Henry (Morney) Wellesley, 6th Duke of Ciudad Rodrigo (1912–1943) from 1941. Upon his death in 1943, the title went to his sister Anne.
- Anne Rhys, 7th Duchess of Ciudad Rodrigo (1910–1998) from 1943, ceded the title to her uncle in 1949
- Gerald (Gerry) Wellesley, 8th Duke of Ciudad Rodrigo (1885–1972) from 1949, ceded the title to his son 1968
- Arthur Valerian Wellesley, 9th Duke of Ciudad Rodrigo (1915–2014) from 1972, ceded the title to his son 2010
- Arthur Charles Wellesley, 10th Duke of Ciudad Rodrigo (b. 1945) since 2010

== Order of succession ==
As of 2024 the heir apparent to the Dukedom of Ciudad Rodrigo is the 10th Duke's eldest child, Arthur Wellesley, Earl of Mornington. Lord Mornington has fraternal twins, a first-born daughter, Lady Mae Madeleine Wellesley, and a second-born son, Arthur Darcy Wellesley, Viscount Wellesley. Lady Mae Madeleine is Lord Mornington's heir apparent to the Spanish dukedom as the eldest child, while Viscount Wellesley is the heir to the British dukedom as the eldest male, which could lead to another separation of these titles.

== Family tree ==
Wellesley family tree: Dukes of Wellington, Victoria, and Ciudad Rodrigo, and Princes of Waterloo

Baron Mornington of Mornington, 1746
Richard Colley Wesley; 1690–1758; 1st Baron Mornington
Earl of Mornington and Viscount Wellesley, of Dangan Castle in the County of Meath, 1760
Richard Colley Wesley; 1735–1781; 1st Earl of Mornington, etc., 2nd Baron Mornington
Baron Wellesley of Wellesley in the County of Somerset, 1797; Marquess Wellesley of Norragh, 1799	Baron Maryborough of Maryborough in the Queen's County, 1821	Viscount Wellington (UK), 1809; Count of Vimeiro (Portugal), 1811; Marquess of Wellington (UK), 1812; Duke of Ciudad Rodrigo (Spain), 1812; Duke of Victoria and Marquess of Torres Vedras (Portugal), 1812; Duke of Wellington (UK) and Marquess Douro and Baron Douro (Portugal), 1814; Prince of Waterloo (Netherlands), 1815
Richard Wellesley; 1760–1842; Marquess Wellesley, etc., 2nd Earl of Mornington, etc., 3rd Baron Mornington	William Wellesley-Pole; 1763–1845; 3rd Earl of Mornington, etc., 4th Baron Mornington, 1st Baron Maryborough	Arthur Wellesley; 1769–1852; 1st Duke of Wellington, etc.
Marquessate Wellesley and Barony Wellesley extinct, 1842
William Pole-Tylney-Long-Wellesley; 1788–1857; 4th Earl of Mornington, etc., 5th Baron Mornington, 2nd Baron Maryborough	Arthur Richard Wellesley; 1807–1884; 2nd Duke of Wellington, etc., 6th Earl of Mornington, etc.	Lord Charles Wellesley; 1808–1858
William Pole-Tylney-Long-Wellesley; 1813–1863; 5th Earl of Mornington, etc., 6th Baron Mornington, 3rd Baron Maryborough	Henry Wellesley; 1846–1900; 3rd Duke of Wellington, etc., 7th Earl of Mornington, etc.	Arthur Charles Wellesley; 1849–1934; 4th Duke of Wellington, etc., 8th Earl of Mornington, etc.
Barony Maryborough extinct, 1863
Arthur Charles Wellesley; 1876–1941; 5th Duke of Wellington, etc., 9th Earl of Mornington, etc.	Gerald Wellesley; 1885–1972; 7th Duke of Wellington, etc., 8th Duke of Ciudad Rodrigo, 10th Earl of Mornington, etc.
Anne Rhys; 1910–1998; 7th Duchess of Ciudad Rodrigo	Henry Valerian George Wellesley; 1912–1943; 6th Duke of Wellington, etc., 11th Earl of Mornington, etc.	Arthur Valerian Wellesley; 1915–2014; 8th Duke of Wellington, etc., 9th Duke of Ciudad Rodrigo, 12th Earl of Mornington, etc.
Baron Wellington of Stratfield Saye, 2026
Arthur Charles Valerian Wellesley b. 1945; 9th Duke of Wellington, etc., 10th Duke of Ciudad Rodrigo, 13th Earl of Mornington, etc., Baron Wellington of Stratfield Saye
Arthur Gerald Wellesley styled Marquess of Douro b. 1978
Arthur Darcy Wellesley b. 2010 styled Earl of Mornington

== See also ==
- List of dukes in the peerage of Spain
- List of current grandees of Spain
- Duke of Wellington
- Prins van Waterloo
- Duque da Vitória
