= Gerald Wellesley, 7th Duke of Wellington =

Anglo-Irish diplomat, soldier, and architect (1885-1972)

His Grace The Duke of Wellington KG DL FRIBA
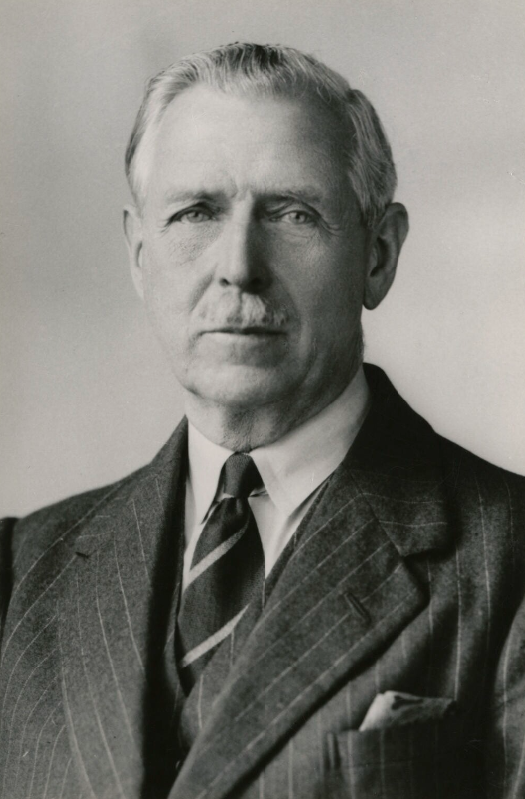

Member of the House of Lords Lord Temporal
- In office 16 September 1943 – 4 January 1972; Hereditary Peerage
- Preceded by: The 6th Duke of Wellington
- Succeeded by: The 8th Duke of Wellington

Personal details
- Born: 21 August 1885
- Died: 4 January 1972 (aged 86)
- Spouse: Dorothy Violet Ashton (m. 1914; sep. 1922)
- Children: Valerian Wellesley, 8th Duke of Wellington; Lady Elizabeth Clyde
- Parent(s): Arthur Wellesley, 4th Duke of Wellington; Kathleen Bulkeley Williams

Gerald Wellesley, 7th Duke of Wellington, KG, DL, FRIBA (21 August 1885 – 4 January 1972), styled Lord Gerald Wellesley between 1900 and 1943, was an Anglo-Irish diplomat, soldier, and architect.

== Background and education ==
Wellesley was the third son of Lord Arthur Wellesley (later 4th Duke of Wellington) and Lady Arthur Wellesley (later Duchess of Wellington, née Kathleen Bulkeley Williams). He was baptised at St. Jude's Church (Church of Ireland), Kilmainham, Dublin, on 27 September 1885. He was educated at Eton.

== Career ==
Wellesley served as a diplomat in the Diplomatic Service in 1908. He held the office of Third Secretary in the Diplomatic Service between 1910 and 1917, and the office of Second Secretary in the Diplomatic Service between 1917 and 1919. He was invested as a Fellow of the Royal Institute of British Architects in 1921, and as a Fellow of the Royal Society of Arts in 1935, and was Surveyor of the King's Works of Art, 1936–43. He gained the rank of Lieutenant-Colonel in 1939 in the service of the Grenadier Guards. He fought in the Second World War between 1939 and 1945. His diplomatic skills proved invaluable in dealing with the Allies.

As a somewhat elderly officer with a spinsterish manner, he earned the nickname 'The Iron Duchess.' Simon Heffer, Editor of Chips Channon's diaries Volume 3 in 2022, records that the nickname was devised by Army colleagues as he was gay.

In 1943, he succeeded his nephew, Henry, as Duke of Wellington, Earl of Mornington, and Prince of Waterloo. His nephew's other title, Duke of Ciudad Rodrigo, passed to Henry's sister (his niece) Lady Anne Rhys, before she ceded it to him in 1949. He served as Lord Lieutenant of the County of London between 1944 and 1949 and as Lord Lieutenant of Hampshire between 1949 and 1960. In 1951, he was made a Knight Companion of the Order of the Garter.

In 1953 he became the first Chancellor of the University of Southampton.

== Architecture projects ==
Among his architecture projects was the remodelling of 5 Belgrave Square, the London home of Henry "Chips" Channon, an Anglo-American member of Parliament, and of Channon's country house, Kelvedon Hall in Essex. Working with Trenwith Wills, Wellesley also remodeled Castle Hill, Filleigh, in Devon; Hinton Ampner in Hampshire; and Biddick Hall in County Durham and St Mary and St George Church, High Wycombe. Wellesley also designed the Faringdon Folly tower for Lord Berners and built Portland House in Weymouth in 1935.

== Books ==
He was the author of the following books :

- The Iconography of the First Duke of Wellington (1935)
- The Diary of a Desert Journey (1938)
- The Journal of Mrs. Arbuthnot (1950)
- A Selection from the Private Correspondence of the First Duke of Wellington (1952)

== Inheritance and estates ==
Following the death of his brother, Wellington inherited an estate subject to a heavy tax burden. Increases in the rates of income tax during the Second World War reportedly reduced the Duke's £40,000 annual income to just £4,000 after the payment of taxes.

=== Wellington Museum ===
In 1947 the Duke gave Apsley House and its important contents (Wellington Collection) to the nation with Wellington Museum Act (but retained the right to occupy a large portion for him and his family)

== Family ==
On 30 April 1914, Wellesley married the wealthy heiress Dorothy Violet Ashton (30 July 1889 – 11 July 1956). The Ashtons were an affluent cotton mill owning family, and Dorothy's father, Robert Ashton of Croughton, Cheshire was a second cousin of Thomas Gair Ashton, 1st Baron Ashton of Hyde). Dorothy's mother was (Lucy) Cecilia Dunn-Gardner, who later became Countess of Scarbrough after marrying Aldred Lumley, 10th Earl of Scarbrough in 1899.

Dorothy had inherited the bulk of her family's wealth following the death of her brother Robert C. N. Ashton in 1912. His gross estate had been valued at £467,902 (equivalent to £44,222,790 in 2023) with a net personality £374,920, from which approximately £77,000 in death duties were paid. His will provided for £60,000 of bequests to various family members, with the residue (approximately £237,000) placed in a trust; the trust income would be paid to Dorothy for her lifetime, and then her descendants in the male line. Under the terms of her father's will, Dorothy would also inherit her father's personal estate (valued at £123,639 following his death in 1898) after the death of her mother.

Wellesley and Dorothy had two children:

- Valerian Wellesley, 8th Duke of Wellington (2 July 1915 – 31 December 2014)
- Lady Elizabeth Wellesley (26 December 1918 – 25 November 2013), mother of the actor and musician Jeremy Clyde.

The marriage was unhappy and they separated in 1922, but never divorced. Dorothy, a poet, was a lesbian. She became the lover of Vita Sackville-West, (who wrote her entry for the Oxford Dictionary of National Biography). before becoming the lover and long-time companion of Hilda Matheson, a prominent BBC producer. Interestingly, Wellesley had been engaged to Sackville-West's former lover Violet Trefusis before marrying Dorothy. Wellesley himself was rumoured to be bisexual or homosexual, but this belief stems largely from certain effeminate mannerisms, and there is no record of any male lover.

After his wife's death in 1956, Wellesley reportedly wished to marry his widowed sister-in-law, Lady Serena James, but she did not wish to leave her marital home.

Wellesley died early in 1972. His probate was sworn in the year of his death at £529,260 (equivalent to about £6,300,000 in 2025). He was succeeded in his titles and estates by his only son, Valerian.

Honorary titles
Preceded by The Marquess of Crewe	Lord Lieutenant of the County of London; 1944–1949	Succeeded by The Earl Wavell
Preceded by The Viscount Portal	Lord Lieutenant of Hampshire; 1949–1960	Succeeded by The Lord Ashburton
Peerage of the United Kingdom
Preceded by Henry Wellesley	Duke of Wellington; 1943–1972	Succeeded by Valerian Wellesley
Peerage of Ireland
Preceded by Henry Wellesley	Earl of Mornington; 1943–1972	Succeeded by Valerian Wellesley
Dutch nobility
Preceded by Henry Wellesley	Prince of Waterloo; 1943–1972	Succeeded by Valerian Wellesley
Spanish nobility
Preceded by Anne Rhys	Duke of Ciudad Rodrigo; 1949–1968	Succeeded by Valerian Wellesley
Portuguese nobility
Preceded by Henry Wellesley	Duke of Victoria; 1943–1968	Succeeded by Valerian Wellesley
