= Lord George Wellesley =

Recipient of the Military Cross (1889–1967)

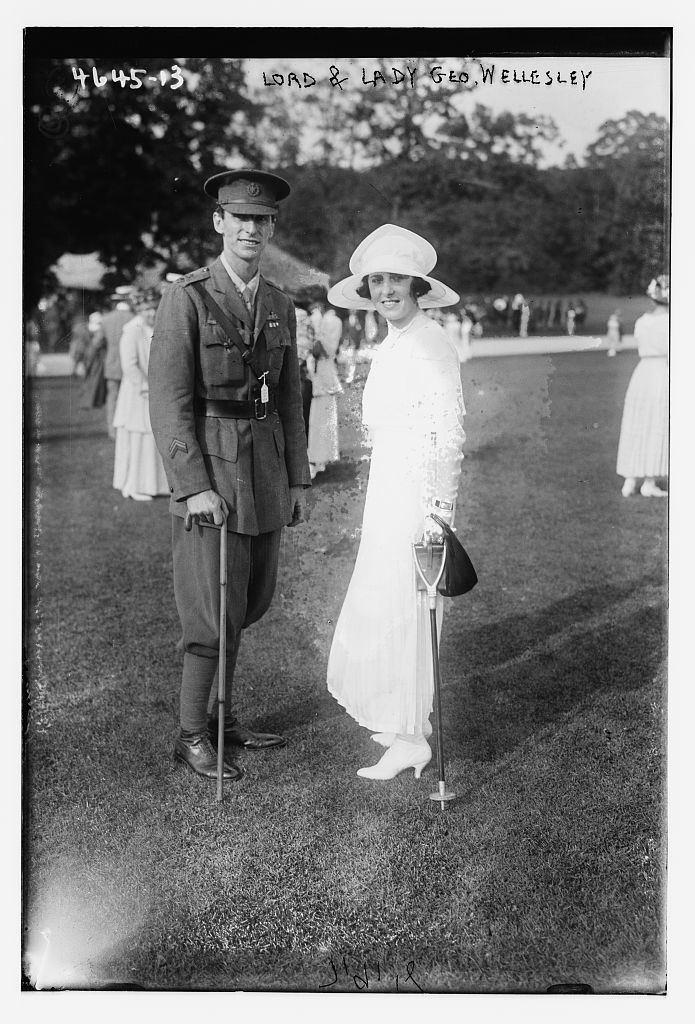
- Lord and Lady George Wellesley in 1918
- Born: 29 July 1889
- Died: 31 July 1967 (aged 78)
- Military career
- Allegiance: United Kingdom
- Branch: British Army; Royal Flying Corps; Royal Air Force
- Service years: 1909–1919; 1939–1954
- Rank: Squadron Leader
- Conflicts: First World War; Second World War
- Awards: Military Cross; Mentioned in Despatches

Lord George Wellesley MC (29 July 1889 – 31 July 1967) was an English soldier and airman.

== Biography ==
Wellesley was born on 29 July 1889, the son of Colonel Lord Arthur Wellesley (later the 4th Duke of Wellington), and Kathleen Emily Bulkeley Williams. His great-grandfather was Arthur Wellesley, 1st Duke of Wellington.

Wellesley was educated at Wellington College, Berkshire. He was Managing Director of Coxeter and Son plc. He was commissioned a second lieutenant (on probation) in the Grenadier Guards on 3 February 1909 and was confirmed in his rank on 1 February 1911. He was promoted to lieutenant on 15 September 1912, and was appointed a flying officer in the Royal Flying Corps (RFC) on 30 June 1914. He was promoted to flight commander on 11 December 1914, with the temporary rank of captain, and was appointed an instructor at the Central Flying School of the RFC on 19 December. He fought in the First World War between 1914 and 1918, where he was mentioned in despatches in June 1916. He was appointed a squadron commander on 1 July 1916, with the permanent rank of captain and the temporary rank of major. He was decorated with the Military Cross in 1916.

On 19 November 1910 Wellesley rescued 20 year old May Haviland from an attempted suicide when she threw herself into the Thames from Putney Bridge with two six pound weights attached to her neck.

Wellesley married Louise Nesta Pamela FitzGerald, the widow of his older brother Richard, in New York, on March 12, 1917. Such a marriage was impossible in Britain until the Deceased Brother's Widow's Marriage Act 1921. The bride was the daughter of Sir Maurice FitzGerald, 2nd Baronet, and Amelia Catherine Bischoffsheim. Richard, a Captain in the Grenadier Guards, was killed in action on October 29, 1914.

Wellesley was appointed a wing commander in the RFC, with the temporary rank of lieutenant colonel, on 1 October 1917. He gained the rank of squadron leader in 1939 in the service of the Royal Air Force Volunteer Reserve (RAFVR). He fought in the Second World War between 1939 and 1945. He was decorated with the Royal Humane Society Medal. He relinquished his commission in the RAFVR on 10 February 1954, retaining the rank of squadron leader.

After the death of his first wife on 21 February 1947, Wellesley married secondly Jean McGillivray, daughter of John McGillivray and Jane Ann Stuart, on 25 November 1955. He had a son, Richard, with his first wife.

Wellesley died on 31 July 1967.
