= Arthur Wellesley, 5th Duke of Wellington =

British peer (1876–1941)

His Grace The Duke of Wellington JP

Member of the House of Lords Lord Temporal
- In office 18 June 1934 – 11 December 1941; Hereditary Peerage
- Preceded by: The 4th Duke of Wellington
- Succeeded by: The 6th Duke of Wellington

Personal details
- Born: 9 June 1876 London, England, United Kingdom
- Died: 11 December 1941 (aged 65) United Kingdom
- Spouse: The Hon. Lilian Maud Glen Coats (m. 1909)
- Children: Lady Anne Wellesley; Henry Wellesley, 6th Duke of Wellington
- Parent(s): Arthur Wellesley, 4th Duke of Wellington; Kathleen Bulkeley Williams

Arthur Charles Wellesley, 5th Duke of Wellington, JP (9 June 1876 – 11 December 1941), known as Arthur Wellesley from 1876 to 1900, and styled as Marquess of Douro from 1900 to 1934, was a British nobleman and landowner.

== Background and military career ==
Wellesley was born in 1876 to Arthur Charles Wellesley (youngest son of Lord Charles Wellesley) and his wife, Kathleen Bulkeley Williams. Wellesley's father inherited the ducal title and vast Wellington estates upon his elder brother's death in 1900, and became the 4th Duke of Wellington.

Wellesley attended Eton between 1890 and 1895, and later attended Trinity College at Cambridge. He was commissioned as a lieutenant in the 4th (Militia) battalion of the Lincolnshire Regiment on 7 July 1897, and served as Aide-de-camp to the Earl of Ranfurly, Governor of New Zealand. After the outbreak of the Second Boer War in late 1899, he joined the regular army as a second lieutenant in the Grenadier Guards on 17 January 1900, and was part of a detachment sent to South Africa in March 1900 to reinforce the 3rd battalion fighting in the war. He served with his regiment there until July 1902, when he returned home after the war ended the previous month. He resigned his commission in 1903. He returned to active service as a temporary reserve second lieutenant in 1915, during World War I, and relinquished his commission in 1919, still a second lieutenant.

In 1934, he succeeded to the dukedom. He was also a justice of the peace.

== Political activism ==
The duke was a supporter of several far right-wing causes. He was a member of the Anglo-German Fellowship from 1935 and served as President of the Liberty Restoration League, which was described by Inspector Pavey (an ex-Scotland Yard detective employed by the Board of Deputies of British Jews to infiltrate the far right) as being antisemitic. When Archibald Maule Ramsay formed the 'Right Club' in 1939, Wellington chaired its early meetings. Ramsay, describing the Right Club, boasted that "The main objective was to oppose and expose the activities of organised Jewry." On the day that World War II broke out, the Duke of Wellington was quoted as blaming the conflict on "anti-appeasers and the fucking Jews". He died of pneumonia in 1941.

== Family ==
Lord Douro (as he was then known) married the heiress Lilian Maud Glen Coats on 23 March 1909 at St George's, Hanover Square. Lilian Coats was the elder daughter of the wealthy industrialist George Coats (who later became the 1st Baron Glentanar in 1916). The wedding reception was hosted by Lilian's parents at their London townhouse, 11 Hill Street, Mayfair. The marriage attracted international attention, and contemporary newspaper articles reported that Coats had provided Lilian with a marriage settlement worth more than £10,000 annually; following Lord Glentanar's death in 1919, his Will revealed that he had settled £300,000 on Lilian when she married Lord Duoro. Under the terms of her father's Will, Lilian was entitled to the value of 20% of his residuary personal estate after subtracting the value of her marriage settlement.

The couple had two children:

- Lady Anne Wellesley (1910–1998), married the Hon. David Rhys, younger son of the 7th Baron Dynevor.
- Captain Henry Wellesley, 6th Duke of Wellington (1912–1943), unmarried.
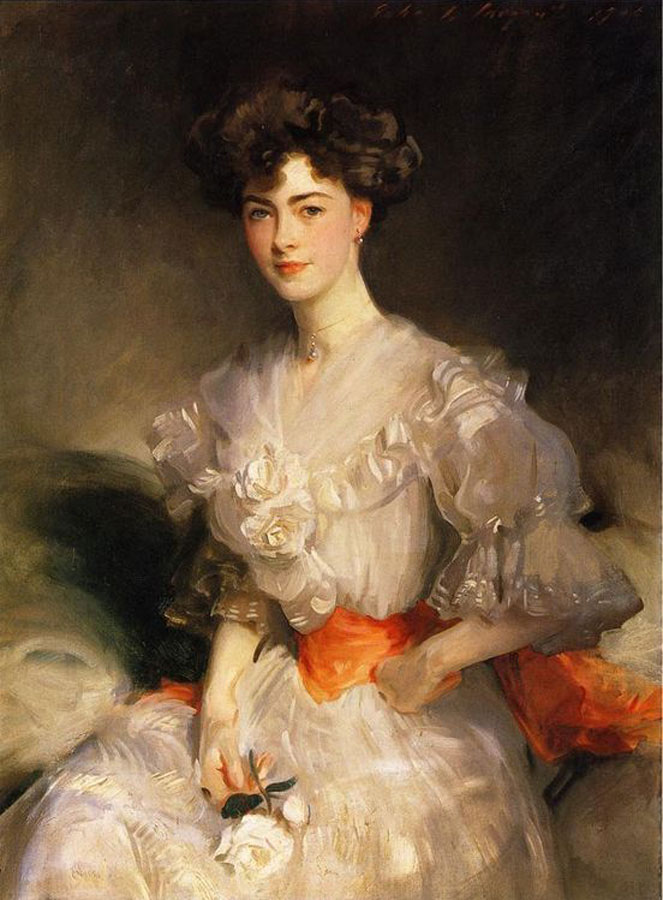
Lilian Maud Glen Coats by John Singer Sargent, 1906

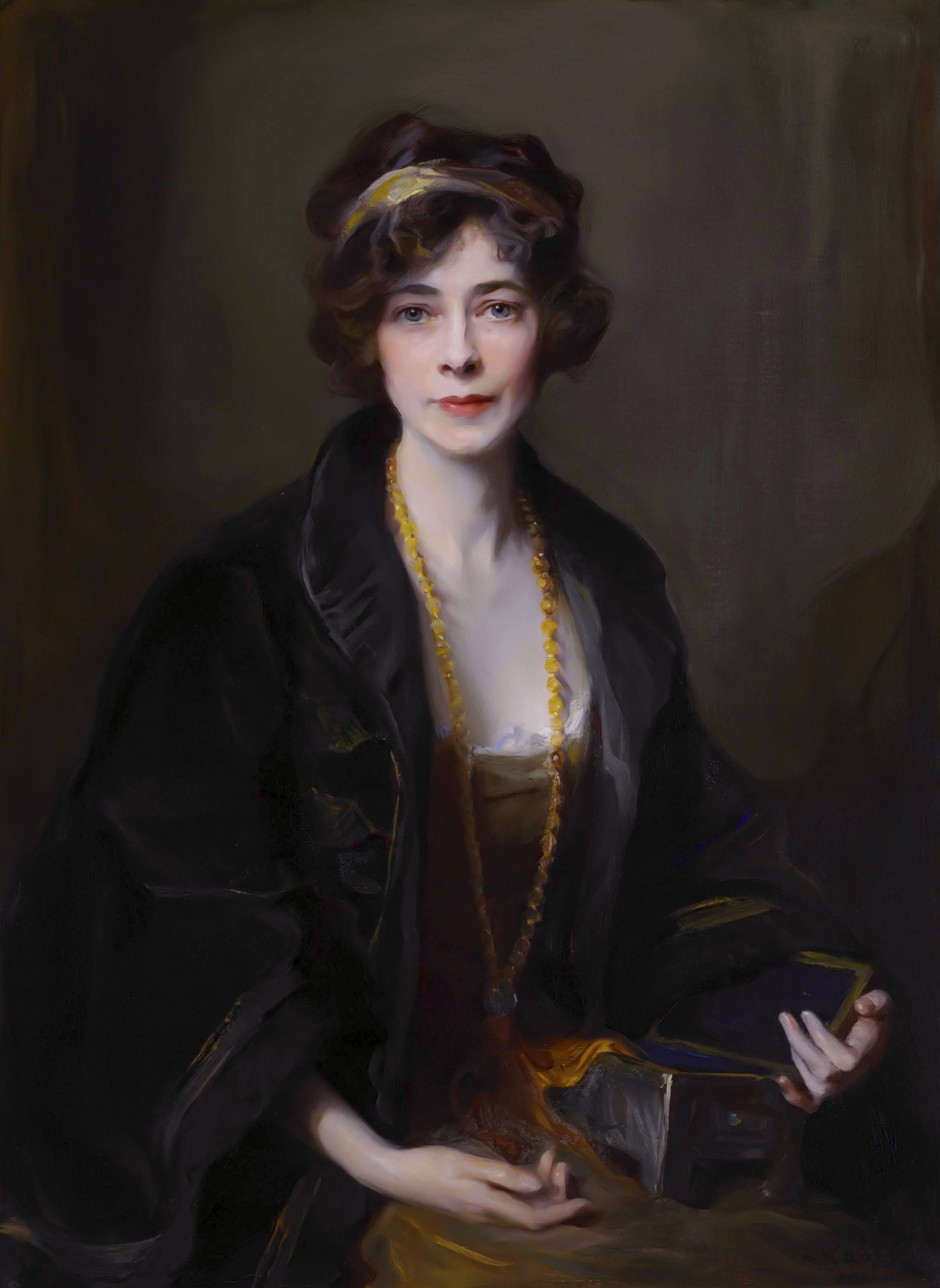
Marchioness of Douro (née Lilian Maud Glen Coats) by Philip de László, 1922

== Death ==
He died at 20 Devonshire Place, London. His probate was sworn the next year at £134,262. (Note: £134,262 in 1941 equates to approximately £5,860,000 in 2025, according to calculations based on the Consumer Price Index measure of inflation.)

== Sources ==
- Clark, Gregory (2023). "The Annual RPI and Average Earnings for Britain, 1209 to Present (New Series)". MeasuringWorth. Archived from the original on 1 April 2023.

Peerage of the United Kingdom
Preceded by Arthur Wellesley	Duke of Wellington; 1934–1941	Succeeded by Henry Wellesley
Dutch nobility
Preceded by Arthur Wellesley	Prince of Waterloo; 1934–1941	Succeeded by Henry Wellesley
Spanish nobility
Preceded by Arthur Wellesley	Duke of Ciudad Rodrigo; 1934–1941	Succeeded by Henry Wellesley
Portuguese nobility
Preceded by Arthur Wellesley	Duke of Victoria; 1934–1941	Succeeded by Henry Wellesley
