= Henry Wellesley, 6th Duke of Wellington =

British peer and politician

His Grace The Duke of Wellington

Member of the House of Lords
- Lord Temporal
- In office 11 December 1941 – 16 September 1943
- Preceded by: The 5th Duke of Wellington
- Succeeded by: The 7th Duke of Wellington

Personal details
- Born: 14 July 1912 England
- Died: 16 September 1943 (aged 31) Salerno, Italy
- Cause of death: Killed in action
- Parent(s): Arthur Wellesley, 5th Duke of Wellington; The Hon. Lilian Maud Coats

Henry Valerian George Wellesley, 6th Duke of Wellington (14 July 1912 – 16 September 1943), styled as Earl of Mornington between 1912 and 1934 and Marquess of Douro between 1934 and 1941, was a British peer.

== Life and career ==
He was the younger child and only son of Arthur Wellesley, 5th Duke of Wellington, and his wife, the Hon. Lilian Maud Glen Coats (elder daughter of George Coats, 1st Baron Glentanar). On 14 October 1933, he received a commission as a reserve second lieutenant in the Coldstream Guards, and he received a regular commission in the same rank in the Duke of Wellington's Regiment on 13 November 1935.

He died, aged 31, on 16 September 1943, during the Second World War, from wounds received in action while leading a group of Commandos. He is buried in the British Salerno War Cemetery, Bivio Pratole, in the province of Salerno, Italy. At the time of his death, he was a captain in command of a troop in No. 2 Commando, commanded by Lieutenant Colonel 'Mad' Jack Churchill.

Both No. 2 and 41 Commando were engaged at the Salerno landings, part of the Allied invasion of Italy. They switched from their initial battle area around Vietri sul Mare, west of Salerno, to a position two to three miles inland of Mercatello, then southeast of Salerno. The Germans held and were strengthening three high-ground positions. During the daytime of 16 September, No. 2 Commando moved back through a valley around the village of Piegolelle, dubbed 'Pigoletti', which had been cleared the night before, intending to capture a hill at the far end referred to as 'Pimple Hill'. However, in the early hours, the Germans had sent light forces back into the valley and also strengthened 'Pimple Hill'. On assaulting the hill two troops of commandos were exposed to well-positioned machine-gun fire. The Duke was among the fatalities: leading a charge against a machine-gun post he was hit by a sustained burst from an MG 42. His helmet was holed in three or four places. He was buried close to the place where he was killed.

His probates (one for his current and future-valued interest in the settled [entrusted] land, one for the rest) were resworn the next year at a total of £90,838 (equivalent to about £3,400,000 in 2023).

As he died without issue and was the only son of his father, he was succeeded in the peerage by his uncle, Lord Gerald Wellesley. His sister, Lady Anne Rhys, succeeded him as 7th Duchess of Ciudad Rodrigo.

Peerage of the United Kingdom
Preceded by Arthur Wellesley	Duke of Wellington; 1941–1943; Member of the House of Lords (1941–1943)	Succeeded by Gerald Wellesley
Peerage of Ireland
Preceded by Arthur Wellesley	Earl of Mornington; 1941–1943	Succeeded by Gerald Wellesley
Dutch nobility
Preceded by Arthur Wellesley	Prince of Waterloo; 1941–1943	Succeeded by Gerald Wellesley
Spanish nobility
Preceded by Arthur Wellesley	Duke of Ciudad Rodrigo; 1941–1943	Succeeded by Anne Rhys
Portuguese nobility
Preceded by Arthur Wellesley	Duke of Victoria; 1941–1943	Succeeded by Gerald Wellesley
