= Arthur Wellesley, 4th Duke of Wellington =

British peer and politician

His Grace The Duke of Wellington KG GCVO DL
- 1917 portrait

Member of the House of Lords Lord Temporal
- In office 8 June 1900 – 18 June 1934; Hereditary Peerage
- Preceded by: The 3rd Duke of Wellington
- Succeeded by: The 5th Duke of Wellington

Personal details
- Born: 15 March 1849
- Died: 18 June 1934 (aged 85)
- Party: Conservative
- Spouse: Kathleen Bulkeley Williams (m. 1872)
- Children: Lady Evelyn Wellesley; Arthur Wellesley, 5th Duke of Wellington; Lord Richard Wellesley; Gerald Wellesley, 7th Duke of Wellington; Lady Eileen Wellesley; Lord George Wellesley
- Parent(s): Lord Charles Wellesley; Lady Augusta Pierrepont

Arthur Charles Wellesley, 4th Duke of Wellington (15 March 1849 – 18 June 1934), styled Lord Arthur Wellesley from 1884 to 1900, was a British peer and politician, and a member of the well-known Wellesley family. He joined the military and served in the Household Division. Upon his childless brother's death in 1900, he inherited the family title and estates.

== Early life and career ==
Wellesley was born in 1849, the second son of Major-General Lord Charles Wellesley and Augusta Sophia Anne Pierrepont. Wellesley's paternal grandparents included the famous Arthur Wellesley, 1st Duke of Wellington, Catherine Pakenham and, on the maternal side, Henry Pierrepont, Lady Sophia Cecil. Between 1861 and 1866, he was educated at Eton. After graduating, Wellesley joined the military. He served as an officer in the Grenadier Guards, the most senior regiment of the Guards' division. The Guards formed part of the Household Division, the elite of the military that provided security for the monarch. To be selected as a member of the Household Division was a great honour, and consequently, recipients received two ranks, one as a member of the Household Division and a second, higher rank, as a member of the armed forces. Wellesley received the rank of Ensign, in his regiment, and Lieutenant, in the British Army, on 13 June 1868. He would later gain the rank of Lieutenant, in his regiment, and Captain, in the British Army, on 15 February 1871.

== Later life and career ==
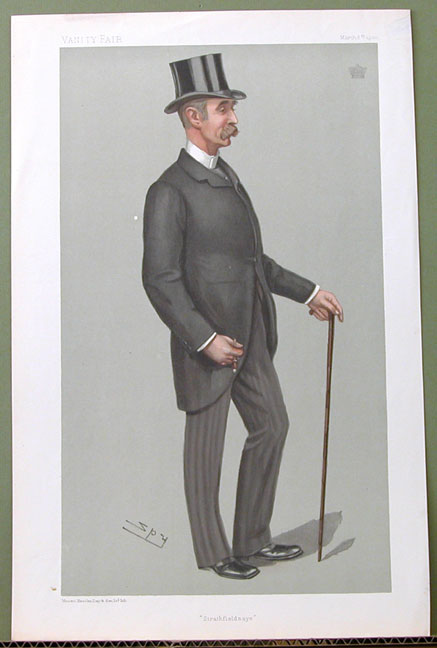
"Strathfieldsaye". Caricature by Spy published in Vanity Fair in 1903

Throughout his career Wellesley saw no combat action: his duties were largely ceremonial as part of the Household Guard. He received the rank Captain in his regiment and Lieutenant-Colonel in the British Army on 5 April 1879. Wellesley received the rank of Major in his regiment and Colonel in the British Army on 1 August 1887.

On 8 June 1900, his childless brother Henry died. Wellesley succeeded to all of his brother's titles: Duke of Wellington, Prince of Waterloo, Duke of Ciudad Rodrigo, and Duke of Victoria. He also inherited the London town-house, Apsley House, and the sprawling family estates of Stratfield Saye House, with over 19,000 acres (7,700 ha) of land granted to the first duke by parliamentary purchase for military services. The estate also included four advowsons; Wellesley had the duty, right, and obligation to select the chief clergyman of those parishes.

From 1900 until 1934 Wellesley was a member of the House of Lords on the Conservative benches. He was also a member of the Marlborough Club, a gentleman's club.

The Duchess died on 24 June 1927 at Apsley House. Wellesley died at Ewhurst Park (House), Basingstoke, Hampshire, on 18 June (Waterloo Day) 1934, aged eighty-five, and was buried three days later at Stratfield Saye House, Hampshire, the home conferred on the Dukes of Wellington. His probate was sworn that year at £150,858 (equivalent to about £9,300,000 in 2025); a further grant was in 1936, for £41,666 (equivalent to about £2,500,000 in 2025), all of which excluded underlying third-party family interests in entrusted land and any gifts before death.

His son, Arthur, succeeded him to the Wellesley family estates and titles.

== Honours ==
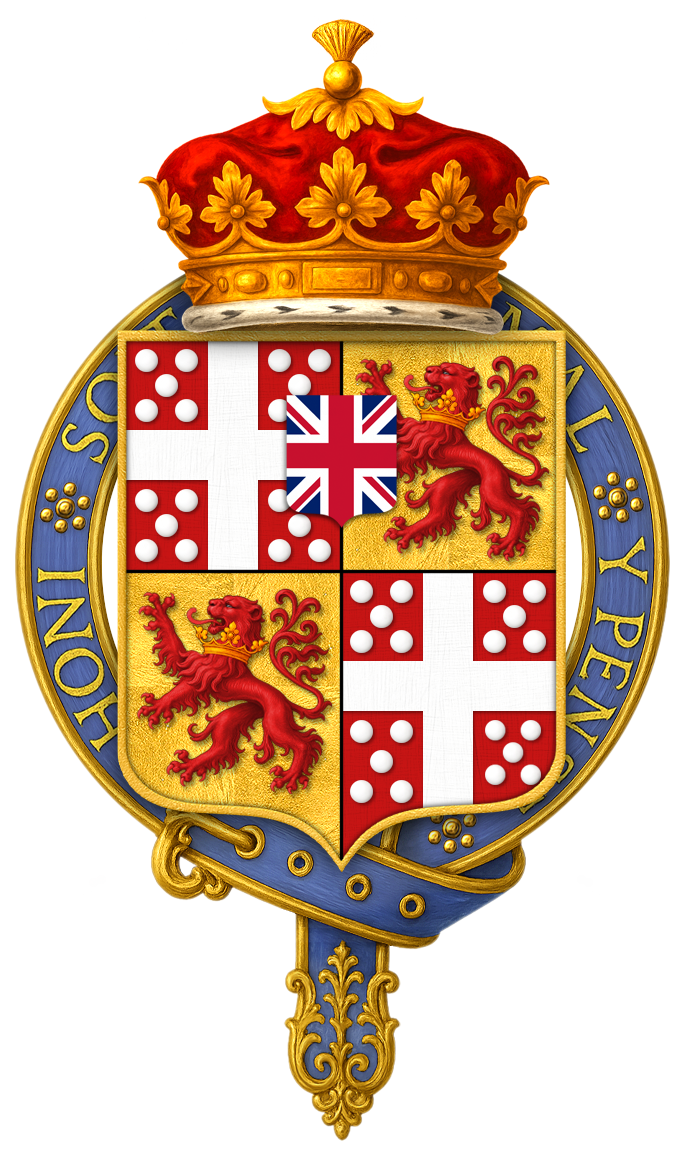
Garter-encircled arms of Arthur Wellesley, 4th Duke of Wellington, KG, GCVO, DL

The Duke received the Knight Grand Cross of the Royal Victorian Order (GCVO) on 1 May 1902. He was appointed a Knight of the Order of the Garter (KG) in the 1902 Coronation Honours list published on 26 June 1902, and was invested by King Edward VII at Buckingham Palace on 8 August 1902. He was also awarded the Spanish decoration of the Grand Cross of Charles III, and the Portuguese decoration of the Grand Cross of the Tower and Sword (GCTE), and the Prussian decorations of the Order of the Black Eagle and the Order of the Red Eagle.

== Family ==
On 24 October 1872, he married Kathleen Emily Bulkeley Williams, daughter of Captain Robert Griffith Williams (brother of Sir Richard Bulkeley Williams-Bulkeley, 10th Baronet) and wife Mary Anne Geale (daughter of Piers Geale, of Dublin). He and his wife had six children :

- Lady Evelyn Kathleen Wellesley (30 July 1873 – 19 January 1922) married Hon. Robert James (son of the 2nd Baron Northbourne), had one son
- Arthur Charles Wellesley, 5th Duke of Wellington (9 June 1876 – 11 December 1941)
- Captain Lord Richard Wellesley (30 September 1879 – 29 October 1914). He was killed during the First Battle of Ypres whilst serving with No. 3 Coy. 1st Bn. Grenadier Guards. He is buried in Hooge Crater Commonwealth War Graves Commission Cemetery in Belgium.
- Gerald Wellesley, 7th Duke of Wellington (21 August 1885 – 4 January 1972)
- Lady Eileen Wellesley (13 February 1887 – 31 October 1952) married Capt. Cuthbert Julian Orde RFC, had two daughters
- Lord George Wellesley (29 July 1889 – 31 July 1967)

In the early 1910s Arthur's wife, Kathleen Duchess of Wellington attracted some newspaper speculation after she successfully arranged for the marriages of three of her sons to wealthy heiresses. The 4th Duke was known to be ranked as one of the "poorer" Dukes in the Peerages of the British Isles during his lifetime.

== Notes ==
Peerage of the United Kingdom
Preceded by Henry Wellesley	Duke of Wellington; 1900–1934	Succeeded by Arthur Charles Wellesley
Dutch nobility
Preceded by Henry Wellesley	Prince of Waterloo; 1900–1934	Succeeded by Arthur Charles Wellesley
Spanish nobility
Preceded by Henry Wellesley	Duke of Ciudad Rodrigo; 1900–1934	Succeeded by Arthur Charles Wellesley
Portuguese nobility
Preceded by Henry Wellesley	Duke of Victoria; 1900–1934	Succeeded by Arthur Charles Wellesley
