= Henry Wellesley, 3rd Duke of Wellington =

British peer and politician (1846–1900)

His Grace The Duke of Wellington
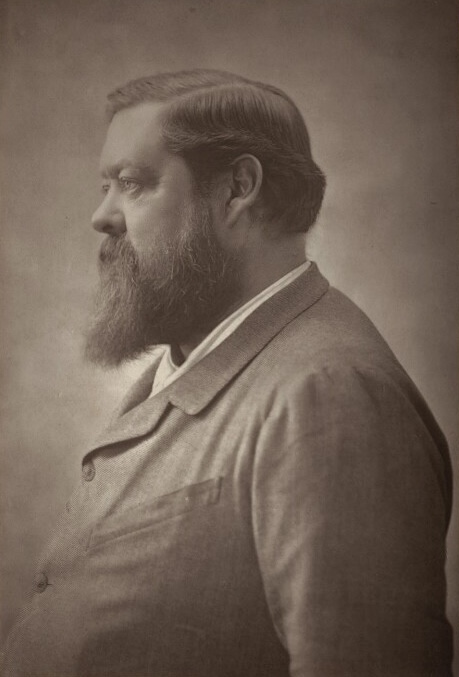
- The Duke of Wellington, c. 1890s

Member of the House of Lords Lord Temporal
- In office 13 August 1884 – 8 June 1900; Hereditary Peerage
- Preceded by: The 2nd Duke of Wellington
- Succeeded by: The 4th Duke of Wellington

Member of Parliament for Andover
- In office 31 January 1874 – 24 March 1880
- Preceded by: Hon. Dudley Fortescue
- Succeeded by: Francis Buxton

Personal details
- Born: 5 April 1846 Apsley House, London
- Died: 8 June 1900 (aged 54) Stratfield Saye, Hampshire
- Party: Conservative
- Spouse: Evelyn Williams (m. 1882)
- Parent(s): Lord Charles Wellesley; Lady Augusta Pierrepont

Henry Wellesley, 3rd Duke of Wellington (5 April 1846 – 8 June 1900) was a British peer and Conservative Party politician.

== Early life ==
He was a son of Lord Charles Wellesley and grandson of the 1st Duke of Wellington. He was born with no title but inherited the dukedom when in 1884 his uncle died childless.

Between 1859 and 1865 he attended Eton.

== Career ==
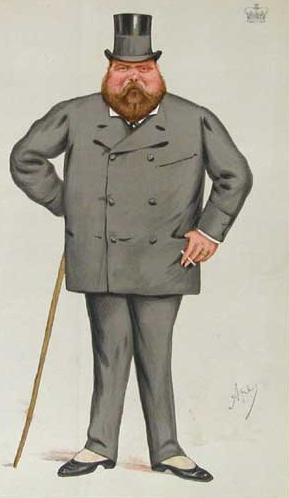
The Duke of Wellington by Carlo Pellegrini, 1885

He joined the 2nd Battalion, Grenadier Guards as an ensign on 16 May 1865, was promoted to major on 1 July 1881, and retired from the service on 28 June 1882. He unsuccessfully contested the Parliamentary constituency of Andover in 1868. He won the seat in 1874 and held it until the next election, 1880.

He succeeded his uncle as Duke of Wellington on 13 August 1884. Subsequently, his sisters Victoria and Mary were granted the rank of daughters of a Duke. He was appointed Honorary Colonel of the Hampshire Militia Artillery on 22 November 1884, and the 6th West York Militia on 10 April 1886. He held both honours until his death. He was special ambassador to Spain for the funeral of Alfonso XII in 1885, and chairman of the Society for the Suppression of Mendicity.

== Personal life ==
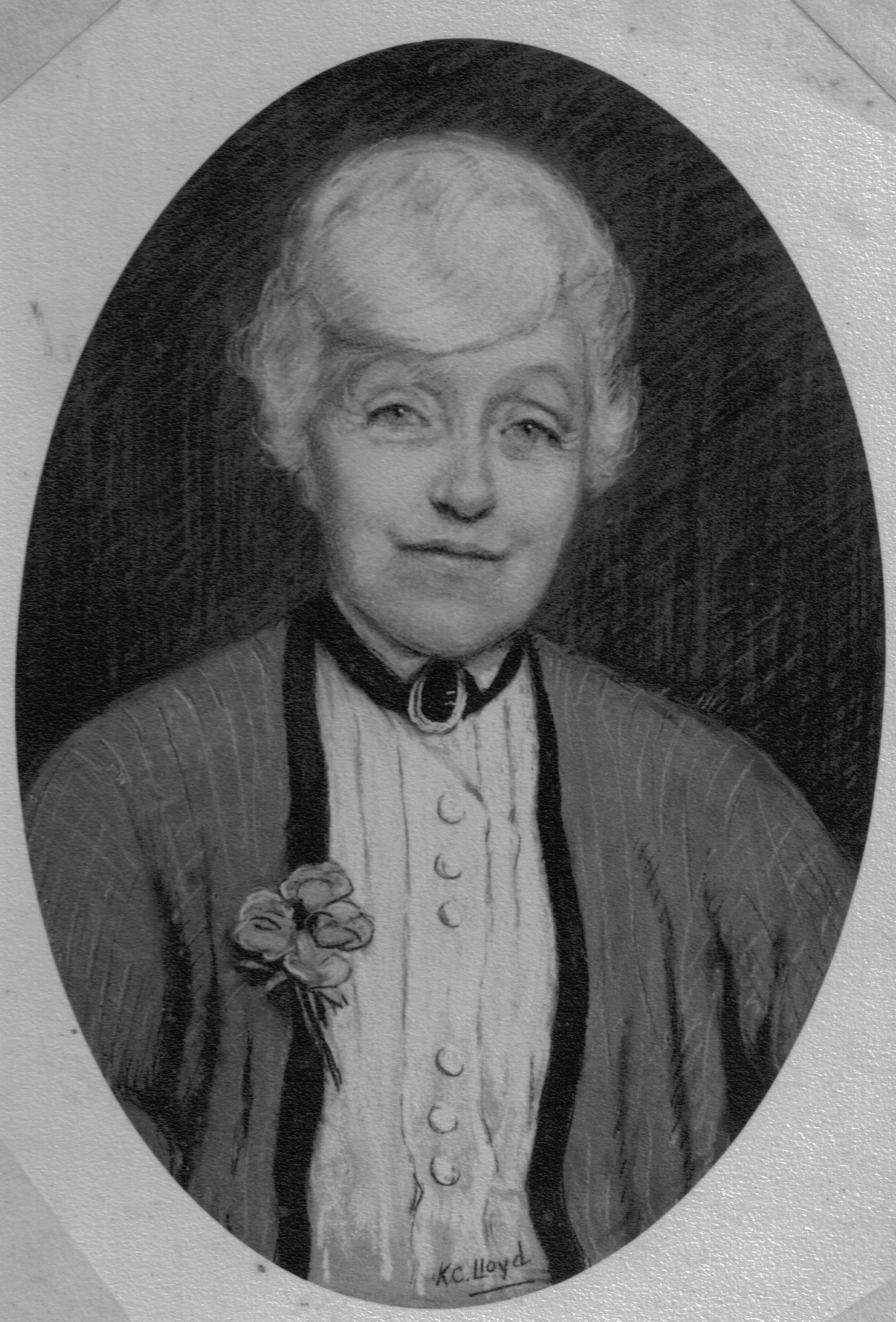
Evelyn, Duchess of Wellington

On 7 March 1882, Wellesley married Evelyn Katrine Gwenfra Williams (1855–1939), a daughter of Thomas Peers Williams, MP for Great Harlow, and sister of Owen Williams, MP, Hwfa Williams, and Edith Peers-Williams (wife of the 7th Earl of Aylesford) among others.

Wellington died at the family home of Strathfield Saye in 1900 and was buried there. As Evelyn and Henry had no issue, he was succeeded by his brother, Arthur Charles. His widow, who remarried to a Wellesley cousin Hon. Frederick Arthur Wellesley (son of Henry Wellesley, 1st Earl Cowley), died on 11 March 1939.

=== In popular culture ===
In her memoirs, Lady Angela Forbes comments that "The Duke was the fattest man I have ever seen, and went by the nickname of "Spurgeon".

Parliament of the United Kingdom
Preceded by Dudley Fortescue	Member of Parliament for Andover; 1874–1880	Succeeded by Francis Buxton
Peerage of the United Kingdom
Preceded by Arthur Richard Wellesley	Duke of Wellington; 1884–1900	Succeeded by Arthur Charles Wellesley
Dutch nobility
Preceded by Arthur Richard Wellesley	Prince of Waterloo; 1884–1900	Succeeded by Arthur Charles Wellesley
Spanish nobility
Preceded by Arthur Richard Wellesley	Duque de Ciudad Rodrigo; 1884–1900	Succeeded by Arthur Charles Wellesley
Portuguese nobility
Preceded by Arthur Richard Wellesley	Duque da Vitória; 1884–1900	Succeeded by Arthur Charles Wellesley
