= Anne Rhys, 7th Duchess of Ciudad Rodrigo =

British noblewoman (1910–1998)

Anne Wellesley
- The Honorable Mrs. David Rhys
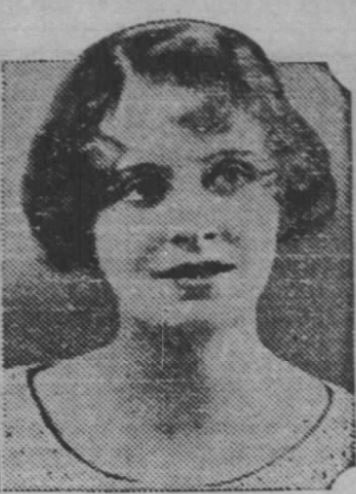
- Anne Wellesley photographed in 1933

Duchess of Ciudad Rodrigo
- Tenure: 1943–1949
- Predecessor: Henry Wellesley
- Successor: Gerald Wellesley
- Born: 2 February 1910
- Died: 1998 (aged 87–88)
- Noble family: Wellesley
- Spouses: Hon. David Rhys (m. 1933 – div. 1963)
- Issue: Llewelyn Arthur Rhys; Elizabeth Maud Rhys
- Father: Arthur Wellesley, 5th Duke of Wellington
- Mother: Hon. Lilian Maud Glen-Coats

Anne Wellesley, 7th Duchess of Ciudad Rodrigo (2 February 1910 – 1998), styled as Lady Anne Wellesley from 1910 to 1933 and titled as the 7th Duchess of Ciudad Rodrigo from 1943 to 1949, was a British aristocrat and a socialite.

== Life and family ==
She was the elder child and only daughter of Arthur Wellesley, 5th Duke of Wellington, 5th Duke of Ciudad Rodrigo, and his wife, the Hon. Lilian Maud Glen Coats (elder daughter of George Coats, 1st Baron Glentanar).

During her late teens, she courted (and was rumoured to be the fiancée of) Edward, Prince of Wales. In the winter of 1928, she was suffering from pneumonia whilst the Prince was touring Africa, and he is said to have received coded radio bulletins about her health. Rumours of their engagement were later officially denied by Buckingham Palace.

On 23 March 1933, she married the Hon. David Rhys, younger son of the 7th Baron Dynevor. She was one of a series of society beauties photographed as classical figures by Madame Yevonde. The couple had two children, Llewelyn Arthur (1935–2005) and Elizabeth Maud (1937–2001), and divorced in 1963.

Her brother, Henry, had inherited their father's titles in 1941. Upon Henry's death in September 1943, she inherited the Spanish Dukedom of Ciudad Rodrigo and the honour of Grandee of Spain (which had been awarded to her ancestor, the 1st Duke, and was able to pass through the female line), whilst the non-Spanish titles passed to her uncle, Lord Gerald Wellesley. She became the 7th Duchess of Ciudad Rodrigo and Grandee of Spain, and her husband was styled as Duke of Ciudad Rodrigo. However, she ceded the dukedom and two estates in Andalucia to her uncle in 1949, in exchange for a monetary settlement.

== Sources ==
Spanish nobility
Preceded by Henry Wellesley	Duchess of Ciudad Rodrigo; 1943–1949	Succeeded by Gerald Wellesley
