= Stratfield Saye House =

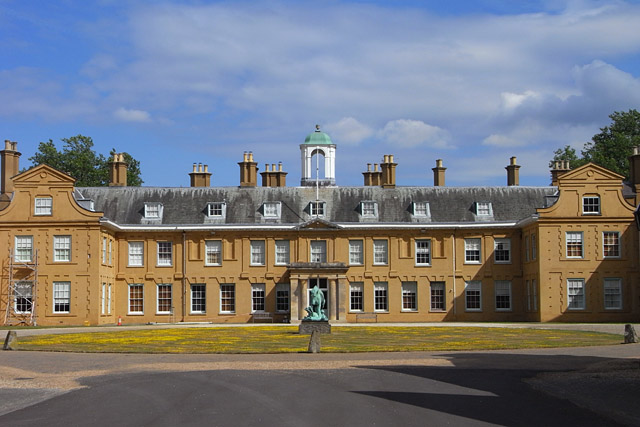

- Location within Hampshire
- 51°20′57″N 0°59′47″W
- Type: Country house
- Location: Stratfield Saye
- OS grid reference: SU 70018 61566

Site notes
- Area: Hampshire
- Owner: Duke of Wellington

Listed Building – Grade I
- Official name: Stratfield Saye House
- Designated: 26 Apr 1957
- Reference no.: 1092773

National Register of Historic Parks and Gardens
- Official name: Stratfield Saye Park
- Designated: 31 May 1984
- Reference no.: 1000866

Stratfield Saye House is a large stately home at Stratfield Saye in the north-east of the English county of Hampshire. It has been the home of the Dukes of Wellington since 1817.

== Early history ==
The line of the Roman Road, the Devil's Highway, passes East to West just within the Northern boundary of the grounds of Stratfield Saye House

The Manor of Stratfield Saye was created by the joining of two older manors. In the 12th century Stratfield was owned by the Stoteville family, and then early in the 13th century this passed by marriage to the Saye family.

Before 1370 the manor passed on again by marriage to the Dabridgecourts, and in 1629 they sold the property to the Pitt family, cousins of the great father-and-son Prime Ministers.

The main part of the house was extensively enlarged around 1630 by Sir William Pitt, Comptroller of the Household to King James I. Sir William's eldest son, Edward Pitt (1592–1643), MP, of Steepleton Iwerne, Dorset, and later of Stratfield Saye, bought the estate for £4,800 in 1629. Further extensive alterations were carried out to the house and park in the 18th century by George Pitt, 1st Baron Rivers.

== Purchase by the state ==
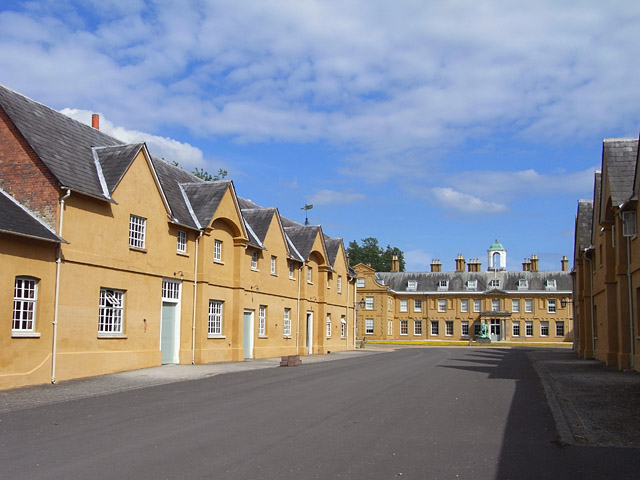
The coachhouses and stable blocks at Stratfield Saye House.

The estate was purchased by the state in 1817, so that it could be given by a grateful nation to the victorious Arthur Wellesley, 1st Duke of Wellington. The government gave £600,000 for the construction of a proposed "Waterloo Palace" to rival Blenheim Palace, home of the Dukes of Marlborough.

The Hampshire site Wellington chose was the 5,000-acre (20 km^{2}) estate of Stratfield Saye, home of the Pitt family. He was advised on the purchase by the architect Benjamin Dean Wyatt who had once been his private secretary. He originally planned to demolish the existing house, and replace it with a more prestigious home, to be known as Waterloo Palace. These plans were abandoned in 1821, when they proved to be too expensive, and subsequently the duke made numerous additions and improvements to the existing building. All but the 1st and 6th Dukes are buried at Stratfield Saye House.

== The Wellington Exhibition ==
The stables are grade II listed buildings. They now contain the Wellington Exhibition, which depicts the life and times of the 1st Duke. It houses a large collection of military mementoes. The Duke's cast bronze funeral carriage, made from melted-down French cannons captured at the Battle of Waterloo, was moved to Stratfield Saye in the 1980s.

== Duke of Wellington Commemorative Column ==
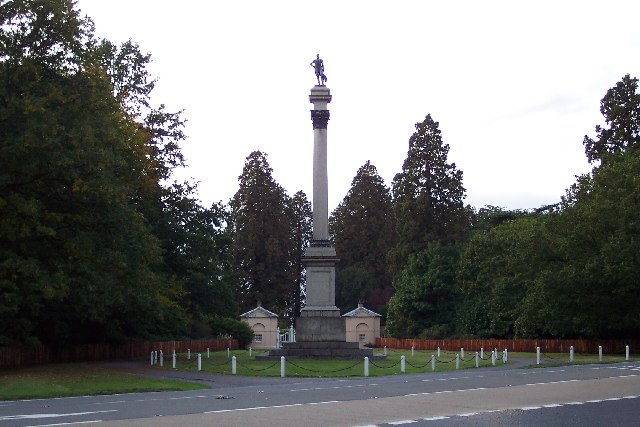
The Wellington Memorial at the entrance to Stratfield Saye House.

The Duke of Wellington Commemorative Column stands at the entrance to Stratfield Saye on the eastern Heckfield side. The Corinthian column, which can be viewed from the A33, is topped by a bronze statue by Baron Carlo Marochetti. The column was erected in 1863.

== Places named after Stratfield Saye House ==
Strathfieldsaye, now a suburb of Bendigo in Victoria, Australia, was named after Stratfield Saye House. Between 1861 and 1994, there was also a Shire of Strathfieldsaye. The name of Strathfield, now a suburb of Sydney, Australia, also comes ultimately from Stratfield Saye House. The names of the suburbs of North Strathfield and Strathfield South, and the Municipality of Strathfield have the same origin.

== In popular culture ==
Filming of the Steven Spielberg film War Horse began in August 2010 with the cavalry scenes being filmed at Stratfield Saye House, where Wellington's war horse, Copenhagen, is buried. The estate features in Avengers: Age of Ultron, where the Barton family farm set was constructed.

== See also ==
- Apsley House – the London home of the Dukes of Wellington
- Waterloo ceremony
- Walmer Castle – the residence of the 1st Duke as Lord Warden of the Cinque Ports
