= Lady Brigid Guinness =

- Princess Frederick of Prussia
- Born: 30 July 1920; London, England
- Died: 8 March 1995 (aged 74); Albury, Hertfordshire, England
- Spouse: Prince Frederick of Prussia (m. 1945; died 1966) Major Anthony Patrick Ness (m. 1967; died 1993)
- Issue: Prince Nicholas; Prince Andreas; Princess Victoria Marina; Prince Rupert; Princess Antonia, Duchess of Wellington
Names
- Brigid Katharine Rachel
- Father: Rupert Guinness, 2nd Earl of Iveagh
- Mother: Gwendolen Onslow

Lady Brigid Katharine Rachel Guinness (30 July 1920 – 8 March 1995) was the youngest daughter of Rupert Guinness, 2nd Earl of Iveagh, and wife of Prince Frederick of Prussia, grandson of Wilhelm II, German Emperor.

== Early life ==
Brigid was born in London, fifth child and youngest daughter of Rupert Guinness, 2nd Earl of Iveagh (1874–1967, son of Edward Guinness, 1st Earl of Iveagh), and his wife, Lady Gwendolen Onslow (1881–1966, daughter of William Onslow, 4th Earl of Onslow). She belonged to the Guinness family, Irish Protestants noted for their accomplishments in brewing, banking, politics and diplomacy.

During the Second World War she served as an auxiliary nurse, where she met her future husband, Prince Frederick of Prussia, when he was injured in an accident involving a tractor.

== Marriage ==
Lady Brigid Guinness married on 30 July 1945 at Little Hadham, Hertfordshire to Prince Frederick of Prussia (1911–1966), fourth son of William, German Crown Prince, and his wife, Duchess Cecilie of Mecklenburg-Schwerin, and grandson of Wilhelm II, German Emperor.

They had five children:

- Prince Frederick Nicholas (born 3 May 1946) married non-dynastically Hon. Victoria Lucinda Mancroft (born 7 March 1952, daughter of Stormont Mancroft, 2nd Baron Mancroft) on 27 February 1980 in London and has issue.
  - Beatrice von Preussen (born 10 February 1981) married Edmund Jenner on 5 February 2022, and has issue:
    - Cecilie Rosetta Robin Preussen (born 18 March 2024)
  - Florence von Preussen (born 28 July 1983) married Hon. James Tollemache (son of Timothy Tollemache, 5th Baron Tollemache) on 10 May 2014, and has issue:
    - Sylvie Beatrice Selina Tollemache (born 2 March 2016)
  - Augusta Lily von Preussen (born 15 December 1986) married Caspar Helmore on 19 September 2015, and has issue:
    - Otto Frederick Charles Helmore (born 11 August 2018)
    - Honor Beatrice Florence Helmore (born 8 September 2020)
  - Frederick (Fritz) Nicholas Stormont von Preussen (born 11 June 1990) married Mathilda (Tilly) Noel Johnson (born in 1989) on 25 May 2021.
- Prince Andreas (born 14 November 1947) married non-dynastically, Alexandra Blahova (28 December 1947 – 8 September 2019) on 2 January 1979, and has issue:
  - Tatiana von Preussen (born 16 October 1980) married Philip Alan Womack (born in 1981) on 28 June 2014, and has issue:
    - Arthur Frederick Richard Womack (born 21 November 2015)
    - Xenia Alexandra Selena Womack (born 29 August 2020)
    - Amalia Maria Brigid Womack (born 29 August 2020)
  - Frederick Alexander von Preussen (born 15 November 1984) married Hon. Antalya Nall-Cain (born 3 November 1987, daughter of Charles Nall-Cain, 3rd Baron Brocket) on 27 September 2020. They divorced on 11 March 2025.
- Princess Victoria Marina (born 22 February 1952) married Philippe Alphonse Achache (born 25 March 1945) on 3 May 1976, and has issue:
  - George Jean Achache (born 8 June 1980) married Alexandrine Pen
  - Francis Maximilian Frederick Achache (born 30 April 1982) married Alice Suzanne Colling (born in 1984)
- Prince Rupert (born 28 April 1955) married non-dynastically, Ziba Rastegar-Javaheri (born 12 December 1954, into a family of wealthy Iranian industrialists) on 5 January 1982 in London, and has issue:
  - Brigid von Preussen (born 24 December 1983) married James Alexander Castell (born in 1985), and has issue:
    - Clara Castell (born in 2018/2019)
  - Astrid von Preussen (born 16 April 1985) married Adam John Valentine Callan (born in 1983), and has issue:
    - Sophie Leila Callan (born in 2021)
- Princess Antonia (born 28 April 1955) who married Charles Wellesley, 9th Duke of Wellington on 3 February 1977 at St. Paul's Church, London, and has issue:
  - Arthur Wellesley, Earl of Mornington (born 31 January 1978) who married Jemma Kidd on 4 June 2005 (divorced in 2020) and married Hayley Elizabeth Whitehead (born in 1986) in 2023, and has issue:
    - Lady Mae Madeleine Wellesley (born in 2010)
    - Arthur Darcy Wellesley, Viscount Wellesley (born in 2010)
    - Honourable Alfred Charles Wellesley (born in 2014)
    - Honourable Arlo Wellesley (born in 2024)
  - Lady Honor Wellesley (born 25 October 1979) who married Hon. Orlando Montagu (born 16 January 1971), younger son of John Montagu, 11th Earl of Sandwich, on 3 July 2004, and has issue:
    - Walter Montagu (born in 2005)
    - Nancy Montagu (born in 2007)
  - Lady Mary Wellesley (born 16 December 1986)
    - Elfrieda Wellesley (born in 2020)
    - Tristan Wellesley (born in 2022)
  - Lady Charlotte Wellesley (born 8 October 1990) who married Alejandro Santo Domingo Dávila on 28 May 2016, and has issue:
    - Marina Santo Domingo Wellesley (born in 2017)
    - Sebastian Santo Domingo Wellesley (born in 2019)
  - Lord Frederick Wellesley (born 30 September 1992) who married Katherine Emma Lambert (born 25 July 1992) in 2021, and has issue:
    - Willow Minna Ida Wellesley (born in 2021)
    - Finneas Fritz Wilfred Wellesley (born in 2023)

Lady Brigid, Princess von Preussen married secondly, on 3 June 1967 at Old Windsor, Berkshire to Major Anthony Patrick Ness (1914–1993); they didn't have children.

== Notes and sources ==
- L'Allemagne dynastique, Huberty, Giraud, Magdelaine, Reference: vol V page 262
