= Lady Charlotte Wellesley =

English socialite

Lady Charlotte Santo Domingo
- Born: Charlotte Anne Wellesley; 8 October 1990 (age 36); St Mary's Hospital, London, England
- Occupation: Photography producer
- Spouse: Alejandro Santo Domingo (m. 2016)
- Children: 2
- Parents: Charles Wellesley, 9th Duke of Wellington (father); Princess Antonia of Prussia (mother)
- Family: Wellesley (by birth); Santo Domingo (by marriage)

Lady Charlotte Anne Santo Domingo (née Wellesley; 8 October 1990) is an English aristocrat, socialite, and photography producer. She is married to Colombian-American businessman Alejandro Santo Domingo.

== Early life and family ==
Lady Charlotte Wellesley was born at St Mary's Hospital, London on 8 October 1990 to Princess Antonia of Prussia and Charles Wellesley, Marquess of Douro. After the death of her paternal grandfather, Valerian Wellesley, 8th Duke of Wellington, in 2014, her father succeeded him as the 9th Duke of Wellington, the 9th Prince of Waterloo, the 9th Duke of Victoria, and the 10th Duke of Ciudad Rodrigo. As such, she is part of the British, Belgian, Dutch, Portuguese, and Spanish nobility. Her mother, Princess Antonia, is the youngest child of Prince Frederick of Prussia and Lady Brigid Guinness. Through her mother, Lady Charlotte is a great-great-granddaughter of Wilhelm II, German Emperor and a great-great-great-great-granddaughter of Queen Victoria. Lady Charlotte grew up at Stratfield Saye House, her family's estate in Hampshire. She is the younger sister of Arthur Wellesley, Earl of Mornington and Lady Mary Wellesley.

== Education and career ==
Lady Charlotte attended Wycombe Abbey, an all-girls boarding school in Buckinghamshire. She graduated in 2013 from the University of Oxford with a degree in archaeology and anthropology. While in university, she competed in the Fastnet Race, a yacht race organised by the Royal Ocean Racing Club.

== Personal life ==
Lady Charlotte married Colombian-American financier Alejandro Santo Domingo in Íllora, Spain, on 28 May 2016. The reception was held at her family's Spanish estate, El Molino del Rey. King Juan Carlos I of Spain and Queen Camilla of the United Kingdom attended the wedding.

The couple have two children, one born in 2017 and one in 2019.

She and her husband were ranked 29th in The Sunday Times 2017 Rich List, with an estimated fortune of £3,682 million. She is one of the youngest people to have been featured on the list.
