= Tatiana von Preussen =

American architect (born 1980)

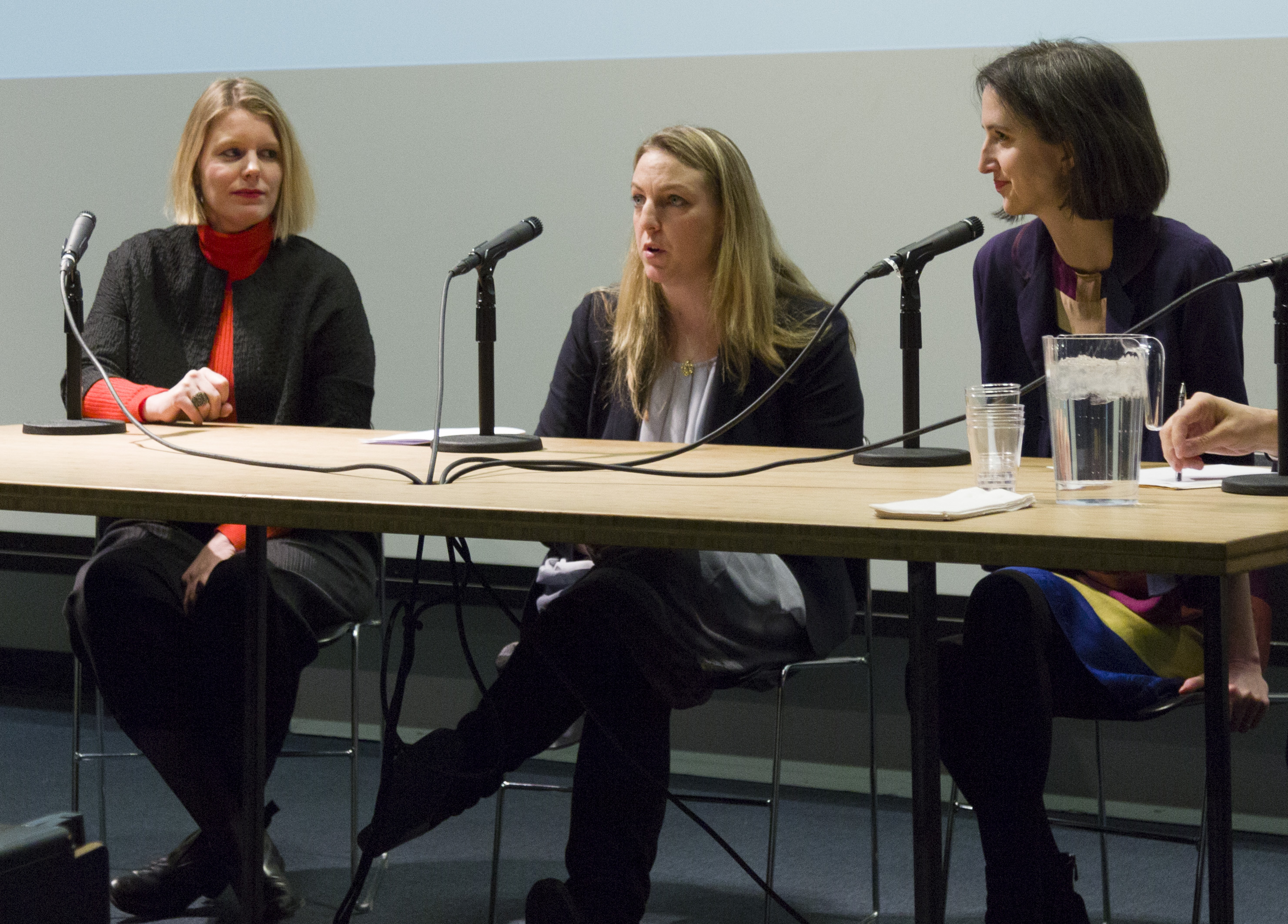
- Pease, von Preussen at centre, Reynolds in 2017
- Born: October 16, 1980 (age 45)
- Education: University of Cambridge
- Occupation: Architect
- Spouse: Philip Womack
- Children: 3
- Relatives: Prince Frederick of Prussia (grandfather); Lady Brigid Guinness (grandmother); Princess Antonia, Duchess of Wellington (paternal aunt)

Tatiana von Preussen (born 16 October 1980) is an architect who worked on the construction of the High Line, an elevated linear park, greenway and rail trail in New York. She graduated in architecture from Cambridge University and Columbia University.

In 2009 Tatiana von Preussen, Catherine Pease and Jessica Reynolds set up vPPR Architects. They jointly won Emerging Woman Architect of the Year at the Architects' Journal's Women in Architecture Awards in 2015.

In 2013 her Otts Yard project, which replaced a derelict workshop with two green roofed houses, won a Royal Institute of British Architects London award and was shortlisted for the Stephen Lawrence Prize.

== Personal life ==
Tatiana von Preussen is the daughter of Prince Andreas of Prussia and Alexandra Blahova, and granddaughter of Prince Frederick of Prussia and Lady Brigid Guinness; on 28 June 2014 she married writer and journalist Philip Womack, and lives in London. They have one son, Arthur Frederick Richard Womack von Preussen (born 21 November 2015) and twin girls, Xenia Alexandra Selena Womack von Preussen and Amalia Maria Brigid Womack von Preussen (born 29 August 2020).
