= Idea-Tec =

Chilean cleantech and upcycling company

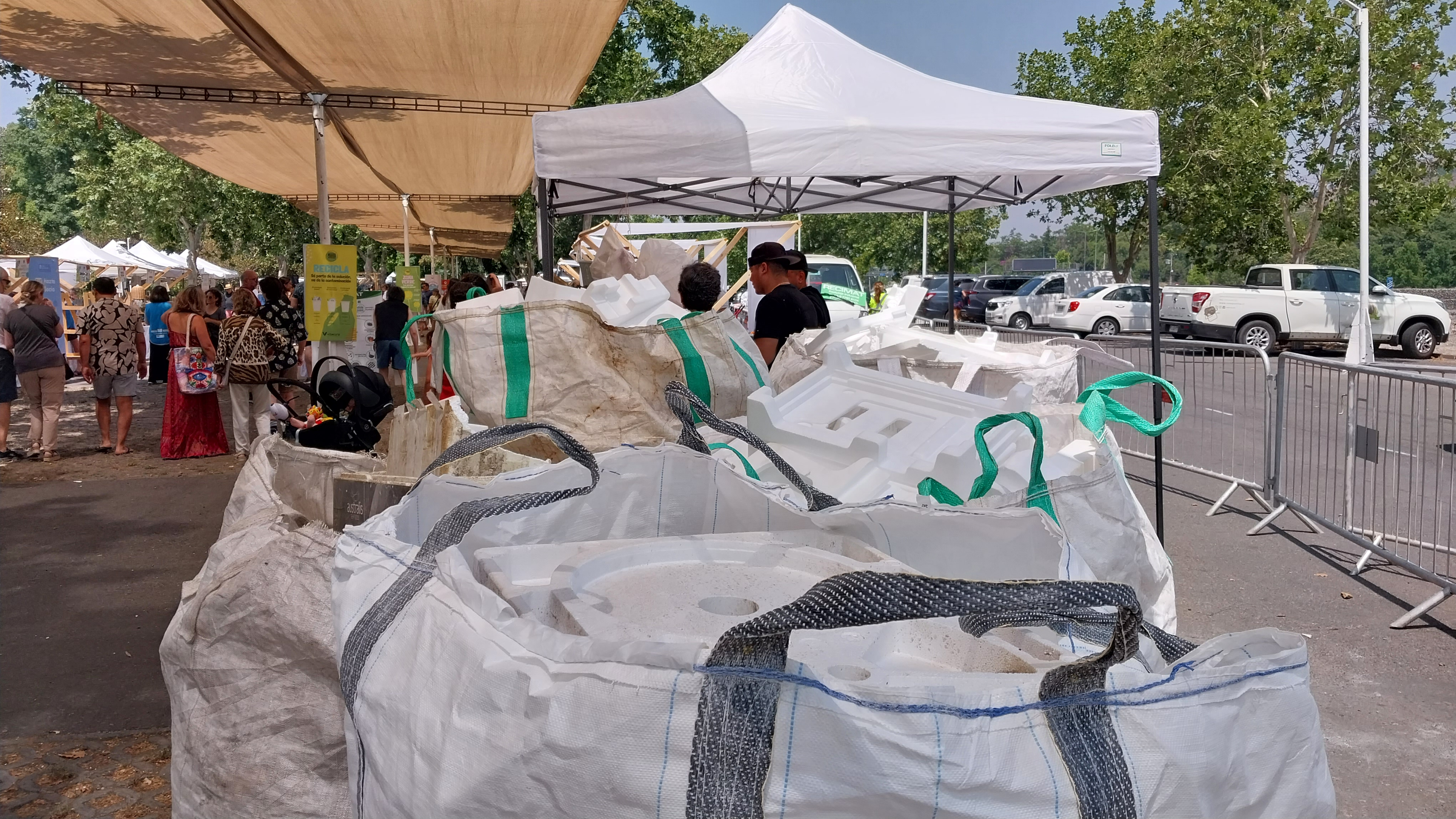
- Polystyrene reception by Idea-Tec in Vitacura recycling market in January 2024
- Founded: 2014
- Founder: Constanza Cifuentes Cristina Acuña
- Website: idea-tec.cl

Idea-Tec is a Chilean cleantech and upcycling company, that turns polystyrene into paint. The company was founded in 2014 by Chilean chemists Constanza Cifuentes y Cristina Acuña.

== Context ==
According to the chemist Cristina Acuña, every year in Chile 20 000 tons of polystyrene end up in landfills or in nature. As polystyrene is composed of air at 95% and is very light, in general it is not profitable to recycle it.

== Creation and history of the company ==
Constanza Cifuentes and Cristina Acuña graduated of chemistry from University of Chile. They knew each other in the university laboratory, in which they were part of the same research group.

They created Idea-Tec in 2014, with the aim of developing technologies based on innovation in chemistry to recycle difficult-to-manage waste. They did research and development for three years before arriving at paint, and initially tried to transform the polystyrene into glue and then into varnish. In 2015, funding from the Start-Up Chile program allowed them to rent a room to a friend to create a small laboratory. They realized that the polystyrene provided the necessary adhesion to the paint. After that, in 2017, they worked on the industrialization of the process.

In 2019, the company had a factory in the municipality of Colina and employed nine people. In 2023, a factory was inaugurated in Lampa.

Its innovation has been patented in Chile since 2020 and in four European countries (France, Spain, Germany, United Kingdom) since 2023.

== Recycling process and environmental impact ==
In its factory, Idea-Tec receives polystyrene from companies, and also from citizens through alliances with the municipalities of Vitacura and Renca. The polystyrene must come clean and not have been in contact with grease.

In the recycling process, the polystyrene is first mixed with other products to dissolve it and extract the air, resulting in a translucent liquid resin, similar to honey. Other materials are then incorporated, as in a traditional paint creation process, such as talc and pigments.

The paints produced by Idea-Tec contain between 14% and 30% recycled polystyrene, thus reducing the use of raw materials.

The founders of Idea-Tec indicate that between its creation and 2023, the company recycled 70 tons of polystyrene and avoided the emission of 250 tons of CO_{2}.

== Economic model ==
Idea-Tec received funding from the Chilean organization Corfo and from its two founders.

The company sells three lines of paint. The first range of paint is a road paint used on the streets and in the parking lots of some shopping centers. The company later developed paints for home use.

In 2019, the company pointed out that its sales were the bottleneck of its processes: although there are large quantities of plumavit to recycle and Idea-Tec sometimes has a waiting list to receive it, the company criticizes the lack of interest from consumers due to the new products and the superficiality of the environmental policies of certain companies, which do not seek to incorporate recycled products in their processes and in their tenders.

In 2023, the company indicated that 5% of its sales were made to individuals and 95% to companies.

== Awards ==
Idea-Tec's innovation received the 2019 Avonni Award in the Natural Resources and Environment category and Cristina Acuña received the InspiraTEC Award in 2022, organized by the Undersecretariat of Economy and Small Business, in the STEM entrepreneur category.
