= Frederick of Prussia =

Frederick of Prussia may refer to the House of Hohenzollern:

- Frederick I of Prussia (1657–1713), First King of Prussia
- Frederick II of Prussia (1712–1786), King known as "Frederick the Great", Grandson of Frederick I
- Prince Frederick of Prussia (1794–1863), Namesake of Fredericksburg, Texas, great-great grandson of Frederick I
- Frederick III, German Emperor (1831–1888), Emperor for 99 days, son of the first German emperor Kaiser Wilhelm I
- Prince Frederick of Prussia (1911–1966), Grandson of Germany's last emperor Kaiser Wilhelm II
