= Alejandro Aravena =

Chilean architect (born 1967)

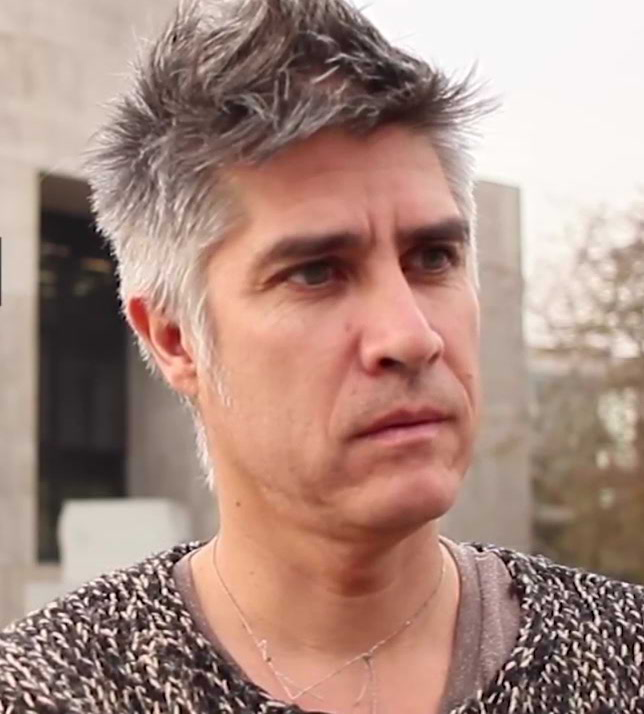
- Alejandro Aravena in 2015
- Born: Alejandro Gastón Aravena Mori; 22 June 1967 (age 59); Santiago, Chile
- Education: Pontifical Catholic University of Chile
- Occupation: Architect
- Awards: Global Award for Sustainable Architecture (2008), Pritzker Architecture Prize (2016), Urban Land Institute J.C. Nichols Prize for Visionaries in Urban Development (2019)
- Practice: Elemental S.A.

Alejandro Gastón Aravena Mori (born 22 June 1967) is a Chilean architect and executive director of the firm Elemental S.A. He won the Pritzker Architecture Prize in 2016, and was the director and curator of the 2016 Venice Biennale of Architecture.

== Education and career ==
Aravena graduated from the Pontifical Catholic University of Chile in 1992, He continued his studies of Theory and Art History in Università Iuav di Venezia in Venice, Italy (1992–1993) and established Alejandro Aravena Architects in 1994. Aravena was a visiting professor at Harvard Graduate School of Design from 2000 to 2005, and is the Elemental-Copec Professor at Universidad Católica de Chile. Aravena co-authored Los Hechos de la Arquitectura (ARQ, 1999), El Lugar de la Arquitectura (ARQ, 2002) and the monograph Elemental: Incremental Housing and Participatory Design Manual (Hatje-Cantz, 2012). He was a member of the Pritzker Prize Jury from 2009 to 2015, and is an International Fellow of the Royal Institute of British Architects.

In 2006, he became the executive director of ELEMENTAL, a for profit company with social interest.

In July 2015, Aravena was named Director of the Architecture Section of the Venice Biennale, with the responsibility for curating the 15th International Architecture Exhibition held in Venice in 2016, with the theme "REPORTING FROM THE FRONT." In his curation of the 15th Venice Biennale of Architecture, Aravena foregrounded social housing, incremental housing, rural-urban relationships, the balance between technology and natural materials, and an attentiveness to manual labor and handicraft. Aravena invited Raphael Zuber, Herzog & de Meuron, Tadao Ando, Peter Zumthor, David Chipperfield, SANAA and Francis Kéré, among others.

In 2025, Aravena was a member of the advisory panel that chose Lina Ghotmeh as architect of the Qatari Pavilion at the Venice Biennale.

== Works ==
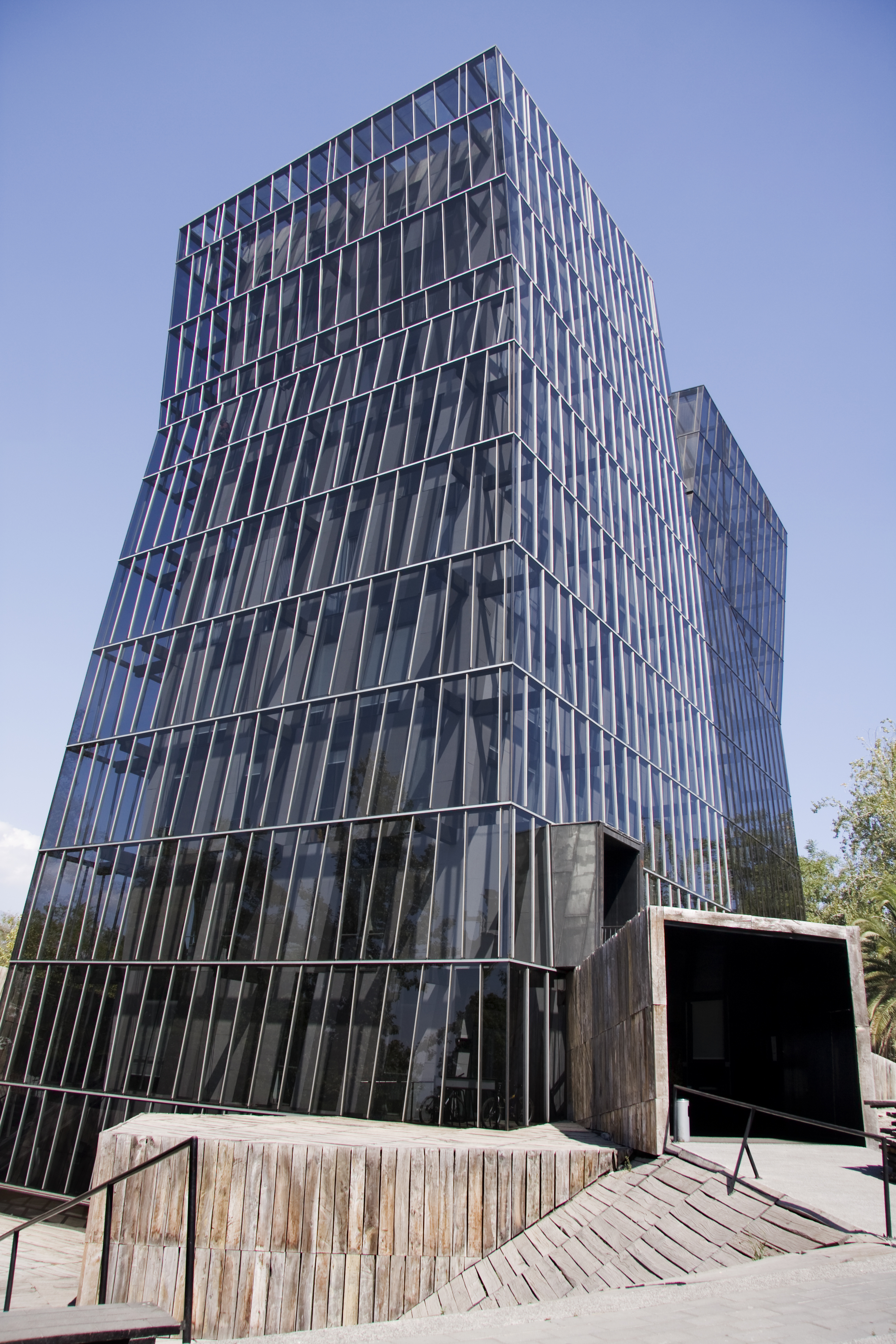
Siamese Towers (2005) at the Catholic University of Chile.

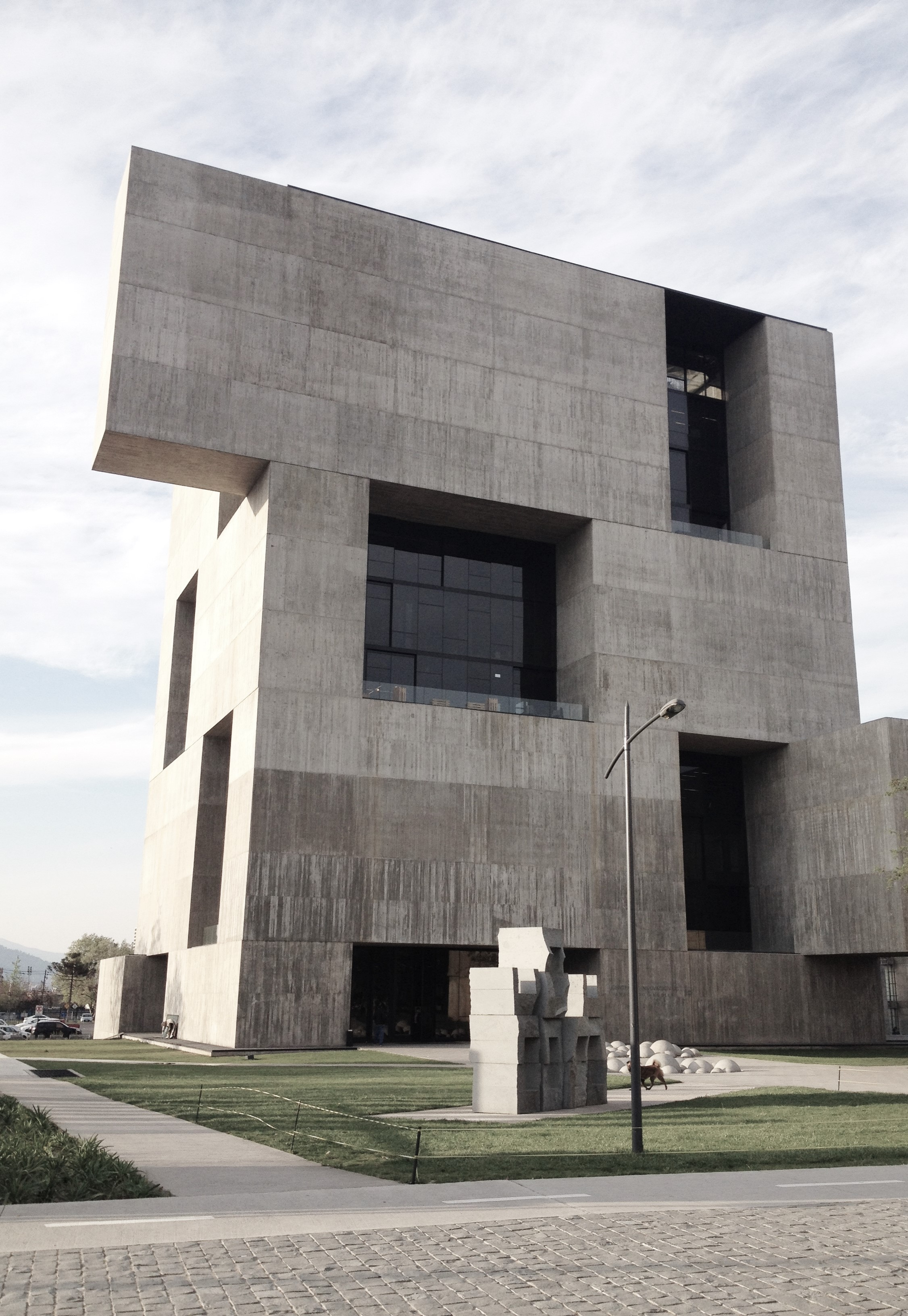
Anacleto Angelini Innovation Center.

Aravena designed the inclined building "Siamese Towers," a workshop building at the school of architecture and faculty buildings at the Pontifical Catholic University of Chile. He designed the Colegio Huelquén Montessori; the Casa para una Escultora (House for a Sculptor); the Casa en el lago Pirehueico (House on Pirihueico Lake); Hunt, Le Mans and Johnson residential halls of St. Edward’s University in Austin, Texas; art workshops on the Vitra campus at Weil am Rhein; Villa in Ordos (Inner Mongolia) and projects for the Elemental initiative. He also designed a children's playground at the Metropolitan Park of Santiago.

== Awards ==
Aravena won the Silver Lion prize at the XI Biennale in Venice, and the Erich Schelling Architecture Medal in 2006. He was a finalist for the Mies van der Rohe Award (2000) and the Iakhov Chernikhov Prize (2008). He received a Global Award for Sustainable Architecture in 2008. In 2011, he was an Index award winner and won a Holcim Awards Silver for Sustainable Construction (region Latin America).

Exhibitions of his work have included shows at the Harvard Graduate School of Design in 2004, the São Paulo Biennale in 2007, the Triennale di Milano in 2008, and the Venice Biennale of Architecture in 2008 and MoMA in 2010.

In 2016, he was awarded the Pritzker Architecture Prize, the most prestigious recognition for architects. From 2009 to 2015, he was a member of the Pritzker Architecture Prize jury.

In 2026, he was awarded the National Architecture Award of Chile alongside Smiljan Radic "in tribute to a body of work of excellence, widely recognized for its quality, influence, and contribution to the development of the discipline, constituting a legacy of exceptional value for national architecture."
