= Rozana Montiel =

Mexican architect

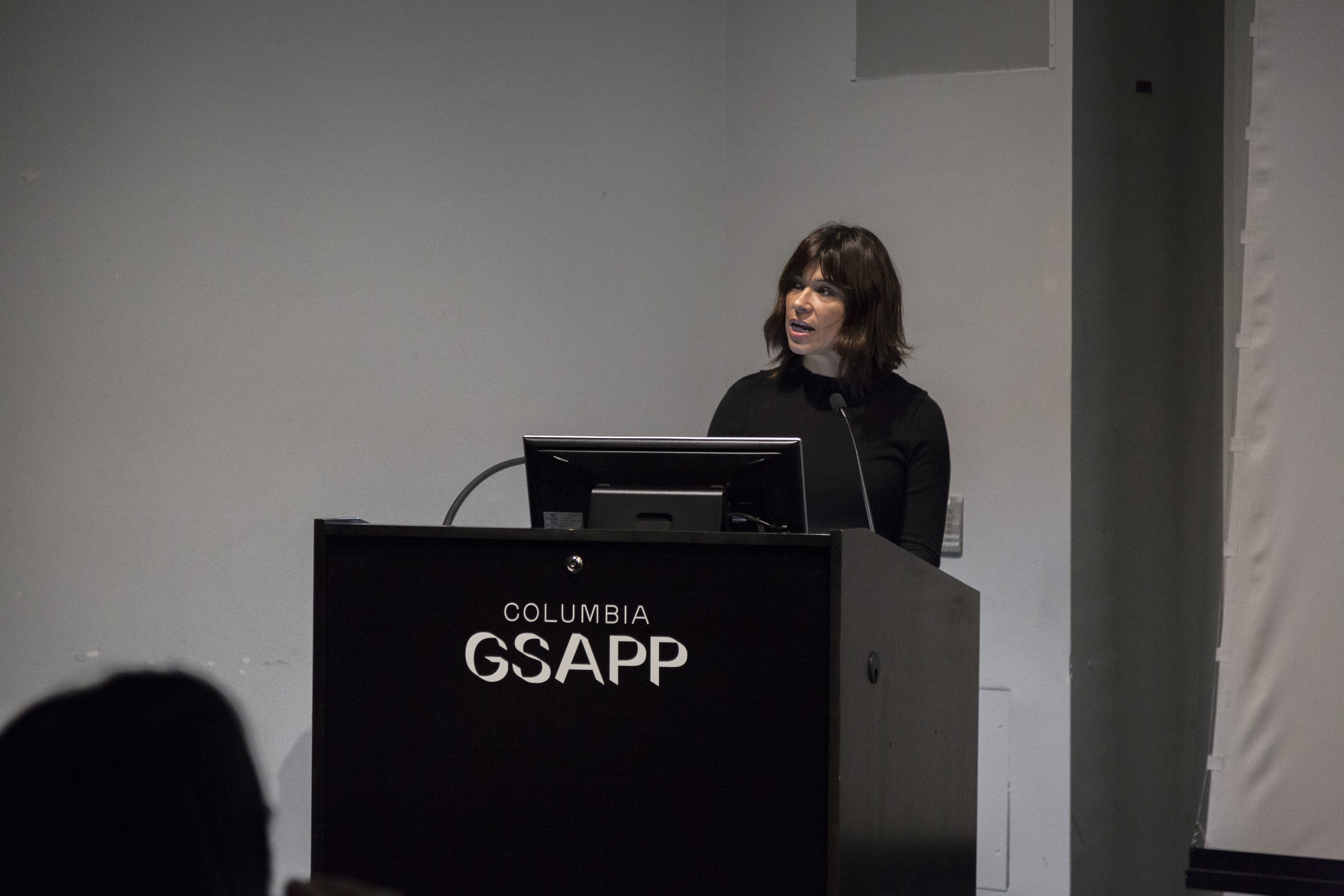
Rozana Montiel at Columbia GSAPP

Rozana Montiel is the founder and director of an interdisciplinary Mexico City architecture studio known for its socially conscious and community-oriented approach to design. Montiel has been recognized for her sustainable development and inventive solutions for enhancing the public realm. Montiel’s work has garnered international attention and has been exhibited in multiple countries and biennials. Montiel is a member of the editorial board of the Architectural Magazine Arquine.

== Education ==
Montiel holds a bachelor's degree with Honors in Architecture and Urban Planning from the Universidad Iberoamericana, Mexico, which she earned in 1998. In 2000 she earned a master's degree in Architectural Theory and Criticism from the Universitat Politécnica de Catalunya in Spain.

== Work experience and notable awards ==
Following her education, Montiel embarked on her career in architecture, working collaboratively with architect Diego Villaseñor from 1998–2000. In 2009, she established her own architectural firm, Rozana Montiel Estudio de Arquitectura, which has since undertaken an array of diverse projects spanning various scales, from micro-objects to urban interventions. Montiel is also a member of the Editorial Board of the Architectural Magazine Arquine and has taught architecture in several universities including the Universidad Iberoamericana.

Montiel’s interdisciplinary work has been exhibited in Mexico, Spain, France, the U.S., England, and China, and presented in the Venice, Sao Paulo, Rotterdam, Lima, and Chile biennials.

Her contributions have been acknowledged with numerous awards, including the Emerging Voices Award from The Architectural League of New York in 2016 and the Global Award for Sustainable Architecture from the Cité de l'architecture et du patrimoine in 2019. She was also recognized with the Moira Gemmill Award by The Architectural Review in London in 2017.

== Notable projects ==
- Stand up for the seas, Pavilion for the Biennale of Architecture and Landscape in Versailles (2022)
- Common Unity, public space renovation, Mexico (2016)
- The incinerator, Located in 17 Mexican ports and airports, (completed 2019)
- Fresnillo playground, Zacatecas, Mexico, with Alan V. Wallach (2017)
- Cosmos pavilions, Valle de Bravo, Mexico, with Claudia Rodgiguez (2022)
- Pilares, urban project, Iztapalapa, Mexico (2022)
- From the territory to the dweller, Infonavit, Xochitepc, Mexico (2018)
- Sanctuary Circle, Cocinas, with Dellekamp + Schleich (2008)
- Casa Negro Y Mila, Mexico City, Mexico (2005)
- Court, Rozana Montiel Estudio de Arquitectura project in collaboration with Alin V. Wallach. Veracruz, Mexico (2016)
- Void Temple, landscape intervention, Rozana Montiel in collaboration with Dellekamp Arquitectos (2011)
- House 4, Apan Housing Laboratory, Apan, Mexico (2019)
- Pro-bono home for earthquake victims, Ocuilan, Mexico (2017)

== Awards ==
- ARVHA International Prize for Women Architects, 2022. This award is organized by Association for Research on Cities and housing with the support of the Île-de-France Region, the French Higher Council of Architects Associations (CNOA), the Pavillon de l'Arsenal and the City of Paris. Montiel is the first Mexican architect to receive this recognition.
- Project Pilares Presidentes de Mexico, recognize with the silver medal of the XVII Bienal Nacional de Arquitectura Mexicana and featured in the exhibition ‘Panorama de Obras de Arquitectura y Urbanismo’ of the XII Bienal Iberoamericana de Arquitectura y Urbanismo (BIAU 2022)
- Proposal, Terre commune, awarded 2nd place in the architecture competition for the new headquarters of the IOM (International Organization for Migration) in Geneva, Switzerland, 2022.
- BUILD magazine Most Outstanding Architectural Designs, Mexico, 2020.
- Global Award for Sustainable Architecture, 2019. Created by Jana Revedin, this award recognizes 5 architects that contribute to a more equitable and sustainable development of the built environment.
- Common Unity project, winner of the 2018 MCHAP emerge award.
- Common Unity project, winner of the “Overall Award” and the 1st. place of the “Moving” category by the Archmarathon Awards, Miami, 2017.
- Moira Gemmill Prize for Emerging Architecture, prizewinner, granted by the British magazine The Architectural Review, London (2017)
- The Architectural League’s Emerging Voices, 2016. Program annually spotlights North American architects, landscape architects, and urban designers who have significant bodies of realized work and the potential to influence their field.
