= Moira Gemmill Prize for Emerging Architecture =

UK-based global architecture award

The Moira Gemmill Prize for Emerging Architecture, originally named Emerging Woman Architect of the Year, is a British-based prize awarded to architects globally. It is aimed at female or non-binary architects under the age of 45 who are founders or leading partners in their practice. It was created in 2012 as part of the Women in Architecture Awards (now W Awards) and renamed Moira Gemmill Prize for Emerging Architecture in 2016 in memory of art director Moira Gemmill. Partners and main sponsors are Architects' Journal and The Architectural Review.

Renowned awardees who went on to higher acclaim include Rozana Montiel (Winner 2017), Mariam Issoufou (Highly Commended 2020), Lina Ghotmeh (Shortlisted 2019) and many more.

== History ==
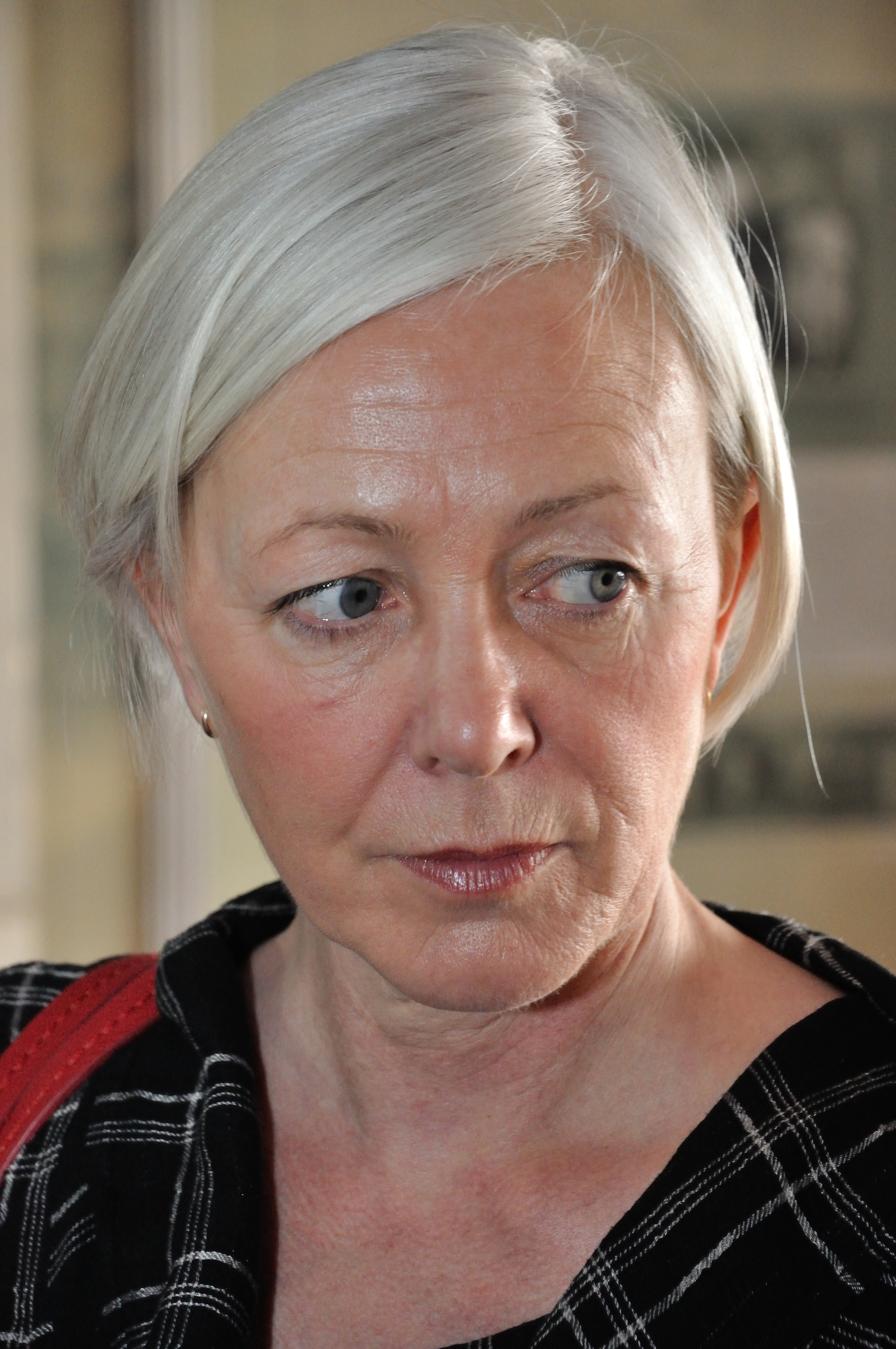
Moira Gemmill (1959–2015) in 2013

The Moira Gemmill Prize for Emerging Architecture, originally named Emerging Woman Architect of the Year, was founded by Christine Murray, editor of the Architects' Journal, as part of the Women in Architecture Awards (now W Awards) in 2012.

From 2012 to 2015 it was presented by the Architects' Journal. Since 2015, when Christine Murray switched to the Architectural Review as an editor, the two magazines have presented the awards conjointly.

The award was renamed Moira Gemmill Prize for Emerging Architecture in 2016 in memory of Moira Gemmill, renowned art director and a judge for the Women in Architecture Awards since their inception, who had died in 2015.

At its inception in 2012, the award was designed for women and came with a £10,000 fund. Beginning in 2020, eligibility was changed to encompass all people who identify as women and non-binary, and from 2021 onward the monetary fund was discontinued.

== Eligibility ==
The official entry information for 2026 states that the prize is open for all entrants who are

- female or non-binary,
- under the age of 45,
- founders or leading partners in their practice.

Entrants can be single architects, partnerships or collectives. The prize is a global prize; entrants from anywhere in the world are accepted.

The prize is awarded by a jury selected by the Architects' Journal and the Architectural Review. It is awarded “in recognition of an overall body of work, with an emphasis on a project completed within the past two years.” Further criteria for awarding are not mentioned in the official entry information, but in 2016 and 2017 press releases surrounding the prize have mentioned “using innovative architecture to effect positive social change” as a criterium. ArchUp names four criteria in their 2026 overview over the W Awards: “the quality of design, creativity, social responsibility, and architectural debate/competition.”

== Recipients ==
The awarded honours encompass being Shortlisted, Highly Commended or chosen as Winner.

From 2012 to 2016, out of all entrants eight finalists were chosen for the official shortlist. From 2017 onward, the number of finalists was lowered to four.

Out of the shortlisted finalists, a winner is then chosen. At the discretion of the jury, a second-placed highly commended runner-up to the winner may also be chosen.

=== Winners of the Emerging Woman Architect of the Year award ===
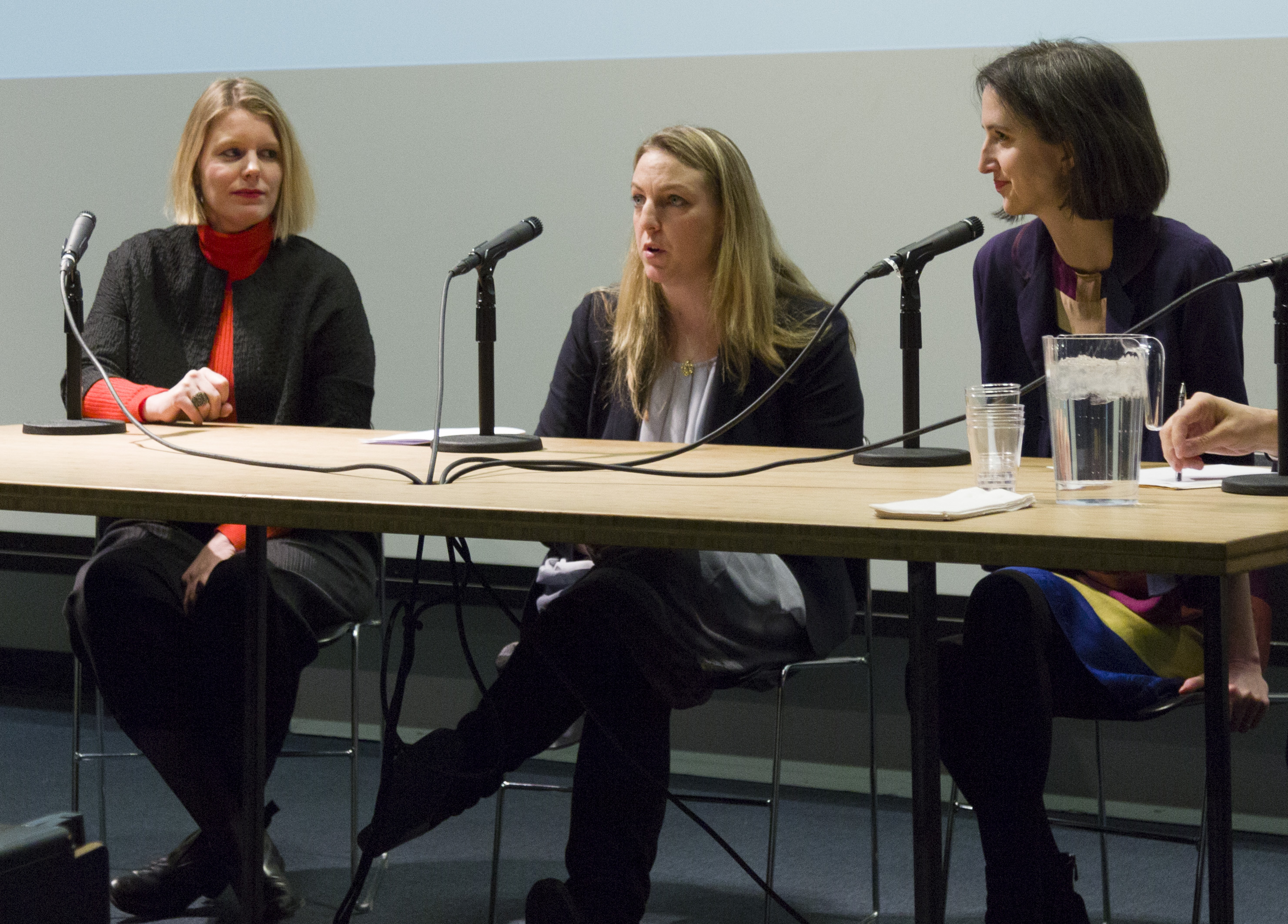
Winner 2015: Catherine Pease, Tatiana von Preussen and Jessica Reynolds of vPPR in 2017

- 2012: Hannah Lawson, Creative Director of John McAslan + Partners, now with Lawson Ward Studio (UK)
  Commended: Nathalie Rozencwajg of RARE Architecture (UK)
- 2013: Olga Felip of Arquitecturia (Spain)
  Commended: Maria Smith (now Smith Mordak) of Studio Weave (UK)
- 2014: Julia King [de] (UK / India)
  Commended: Hannah Corlett of Assemblage (now HNNA) (UK)
- 2015: Tatiana von Preussen, Catherine Pease and Jessica Reynolds of vPPR (UK / Germany)

=== Finalists of the Moira Gemmill Prize for Emerging Architecture ===
==== 2016 ====
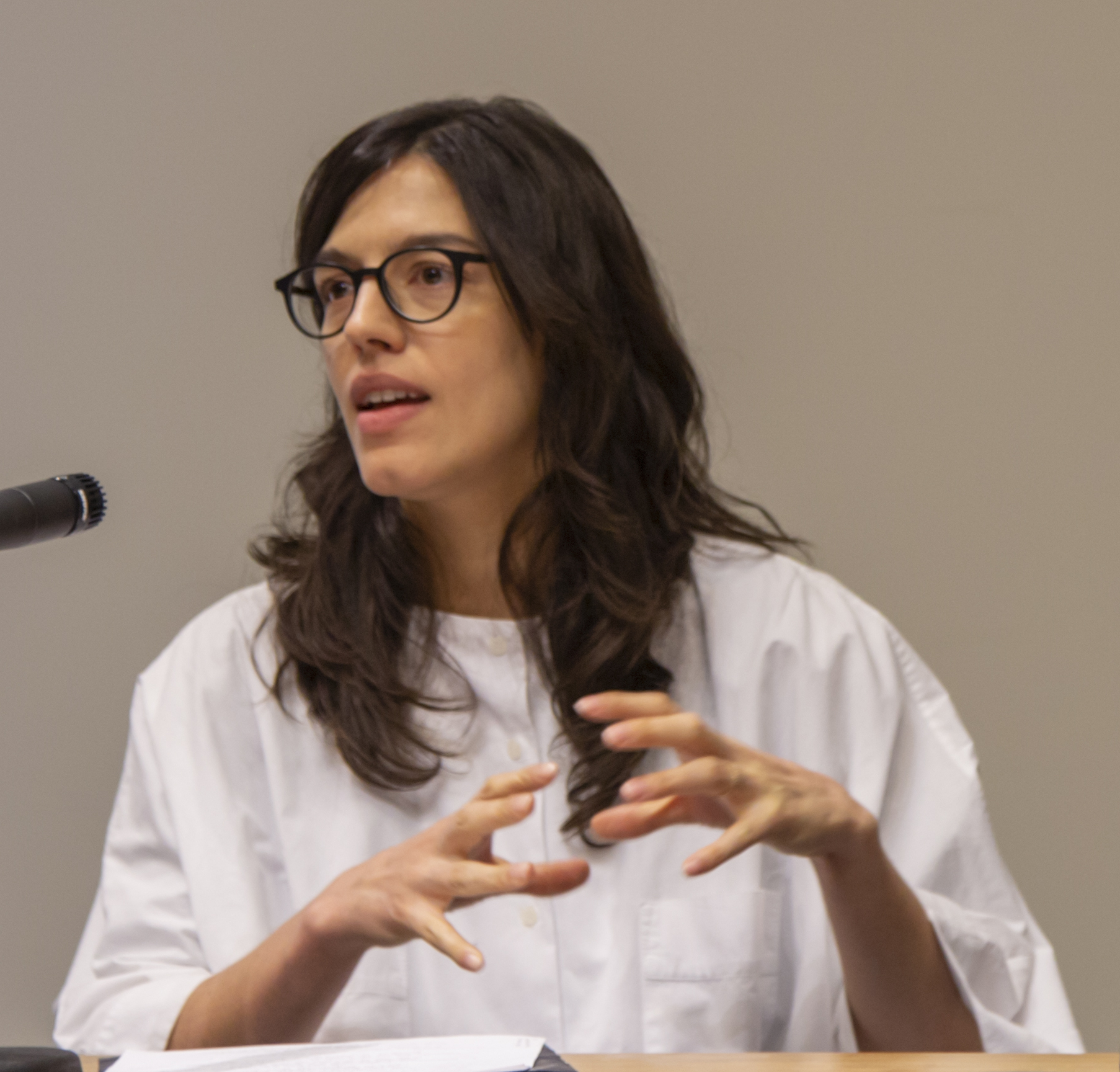
Winner 2016: Gabriela Etchegaray Cerón in 2018

Winner

- Gabriela Etchegaray Cerón of Ambrosi Etchegaray (Mexico)

Shortlisted

- Elisa Burnazzi of Burnazzi Feltrin Architects (Italy)
- Marie Zawistowski of OnSite (USA)
- Anna Heringer (Germany)
- Di Zhang of WAA (China)
- Saija Hollmén, Jenni Reuter and Helena Sandman of Hollmén Reuter Sandman (Finland)
- Petra Gipp [sv–fi] of Petra Gipp Arkitektur (Sweden)
- Catherine Johnson and Rebecca ‘RA’ Rudolph of Design, Bitches (USA)

==== 2017 ====
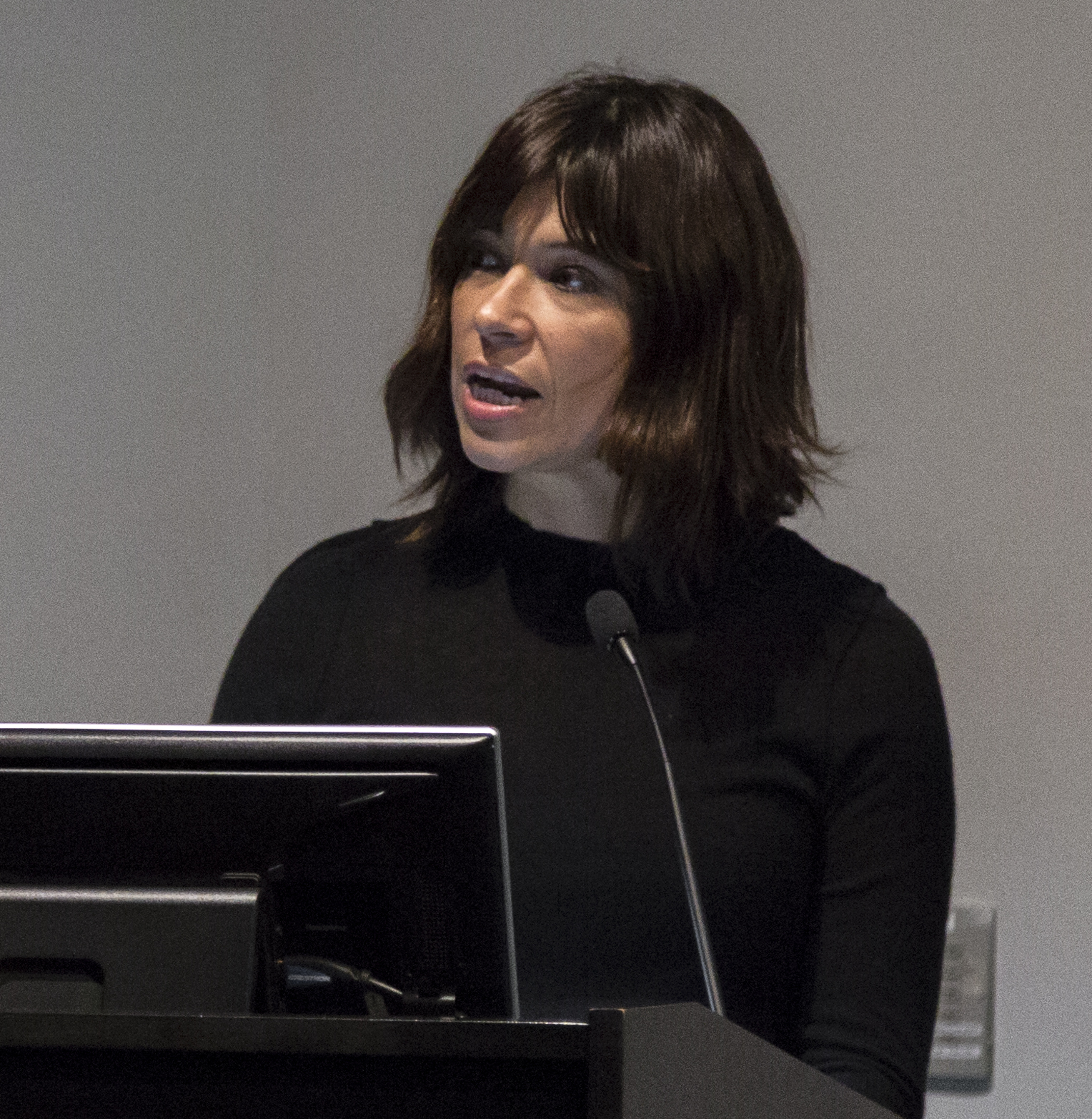
Winner 2017: Rozana Montiel in 2018

Winner

- Rozana Montiel of Rozana Montiel Estudio de Arquitectura (Mexico)

Shortlisted

- Johanna Hurme of 5468796 Architecture (Canada)
- Ada Yvars Bravo of Mangera Yvars
- Jing Liu of SO-IL (USA)

==== 2018 ====
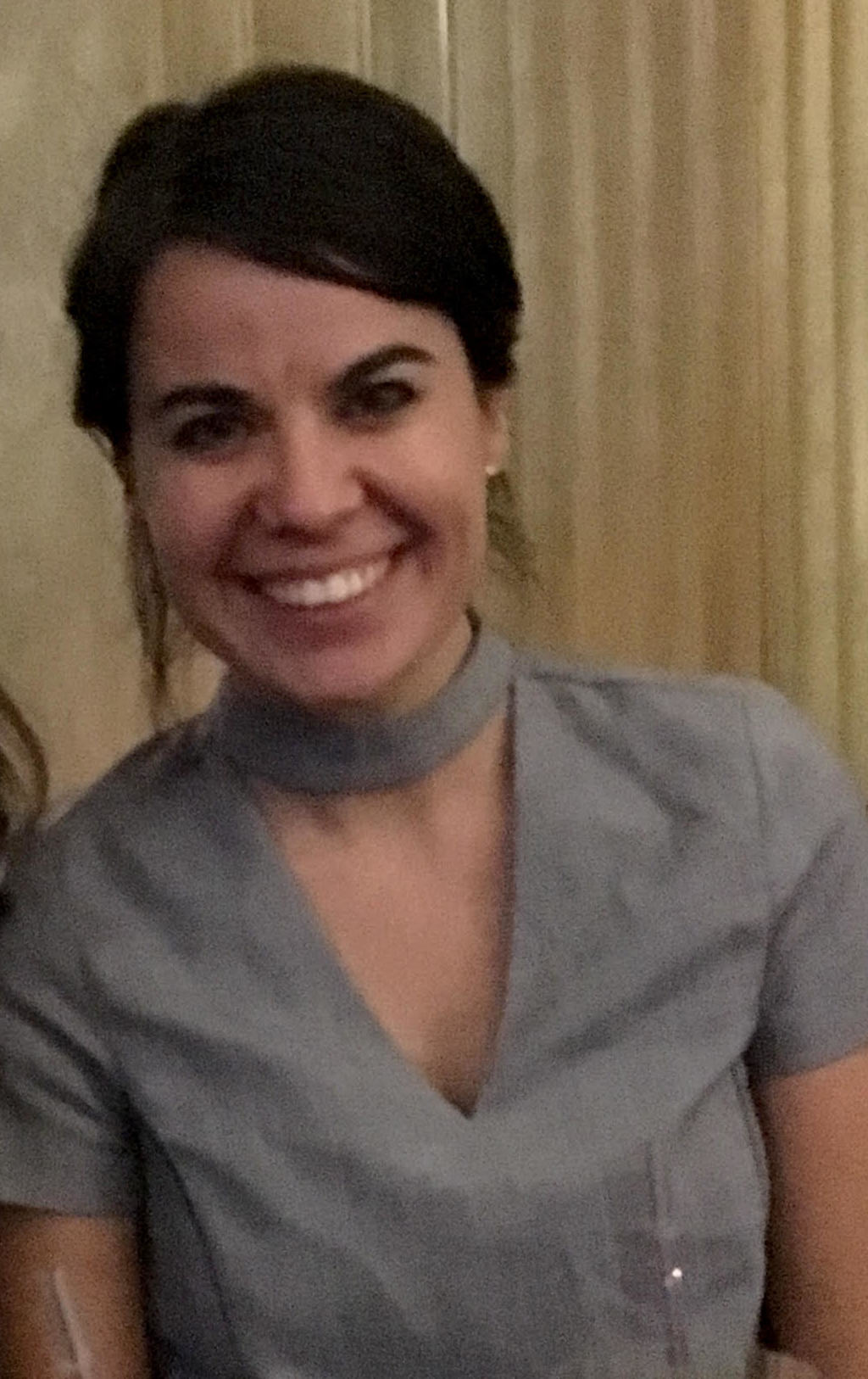
Winner 2018: Gloria Cabral in 2018

Winner

- Gloria Cabral, of Gabinete de Arquitectura (Paraguay), now of Studio 4.4 (Brazil)

Shortlisted

- Anna Puigjnaner and Maria Charneco of MAIO (Spain)
- Sook Hee Chun of WISE Architecture (South Korea)
- Ilze Wolff of Wolff Architects (South Africa)

==== 2019 ====
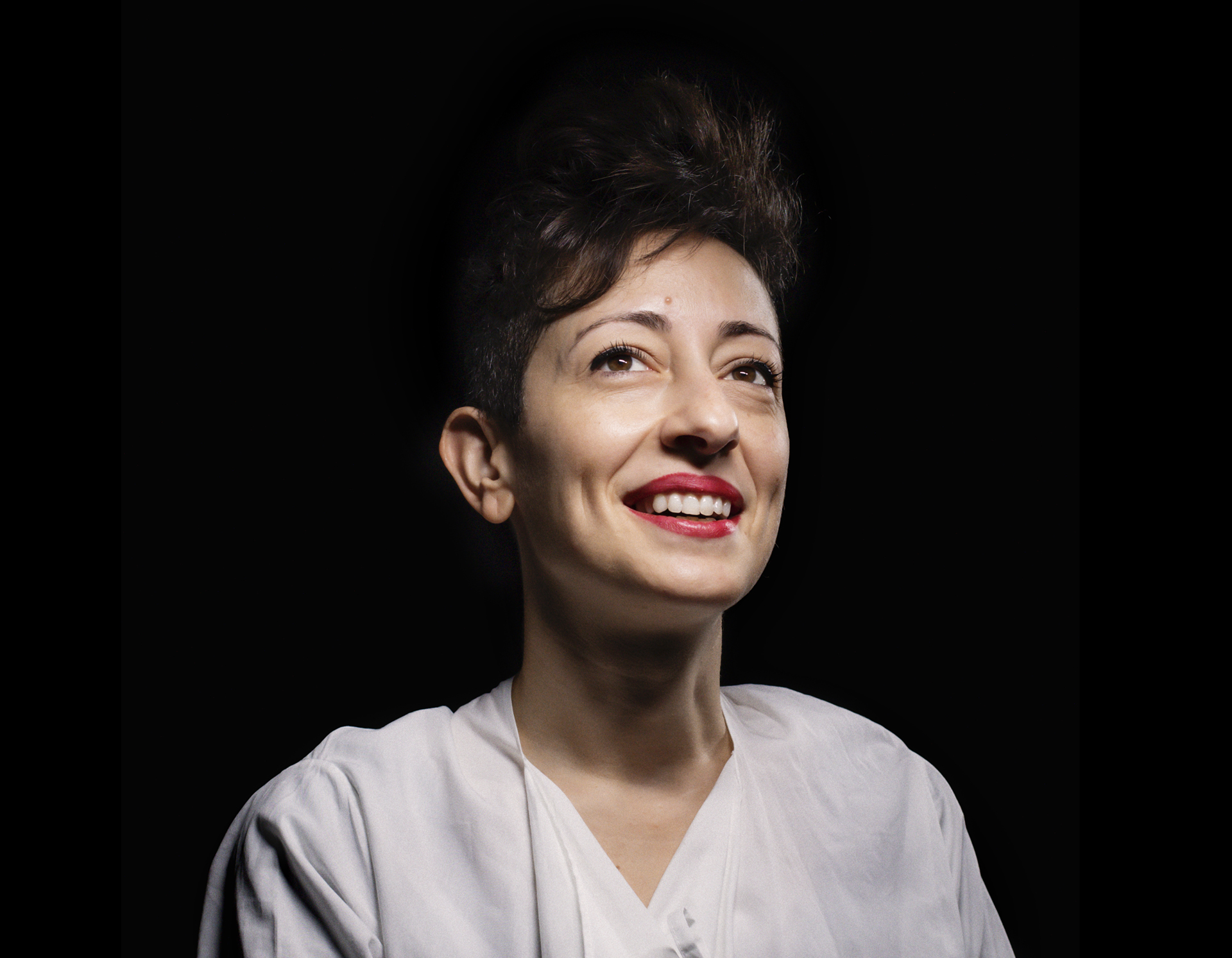
Shortlisted 2019: Lina Ghotmeh in 2021

Winner

- Xu Tiantian of DnA Design and Architecture (China)

Shortlisted

- Lina Ghotmeh of Lina Ghotmeh Architecture (France)
- Irene Pérez of TEd’A Arquitectes (Spain)
- Jeannette Kuo of Karamuk Kuo (Switzerland)

==== 2020 ====
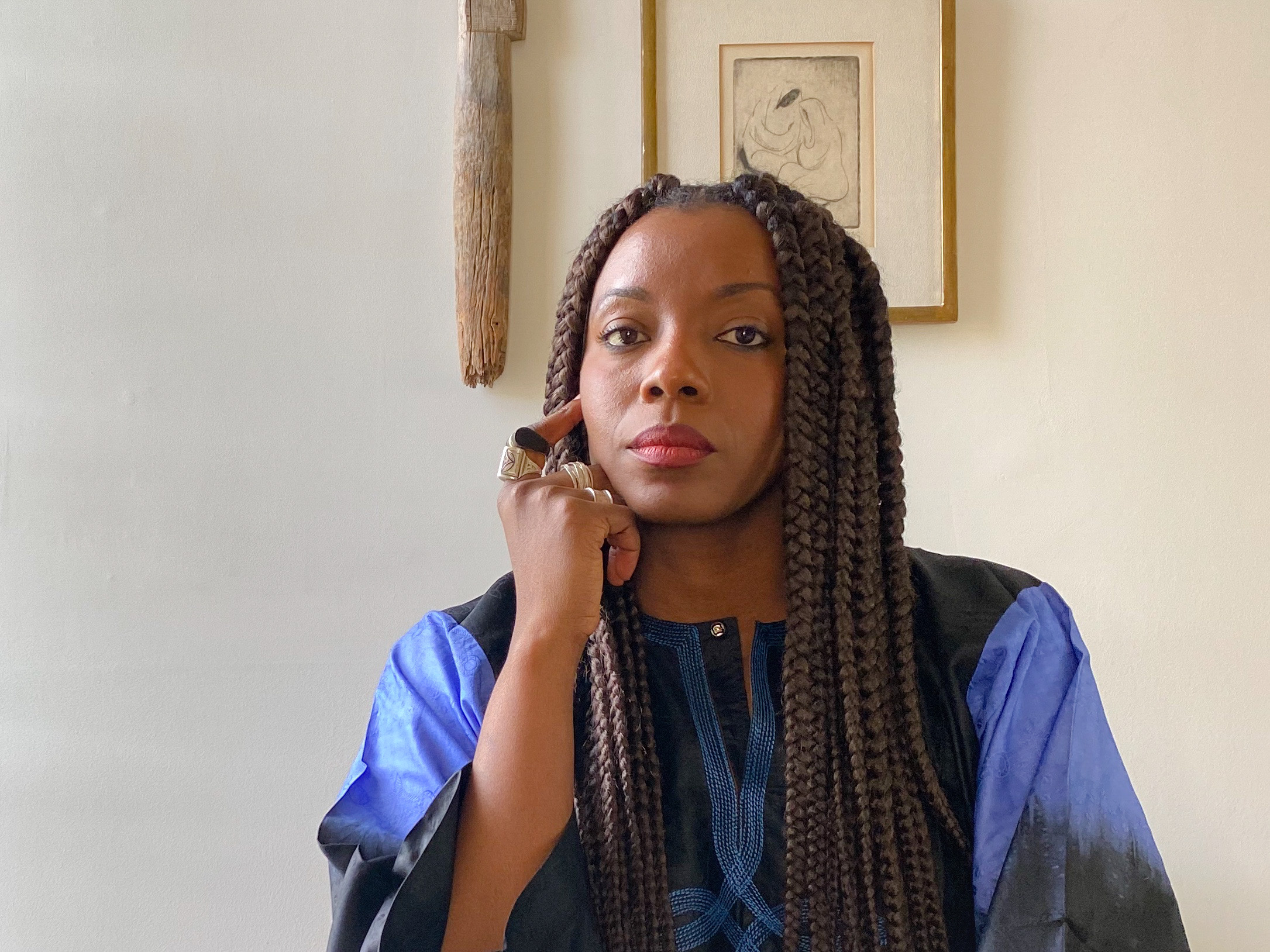
Highly Commended 2020: Mariam Issoufou Kamara in 2020

Winner

- Francesca Torzo [nl–de] of Francesca Torzo Architetto (Italy)

Highly Commended

- Mariam Kamara of atelier masōmī, now Mariam Issoufou Architects (Niger)

Shortlisted

- Simona Della Rocca of BDR bureau (Italy)
- Stefanie Rhodes of Gatti Routh Rhodes (UK)

==== 2021 ====
Winner

- Ariadna Artigas, Anna Clemente, Eulàlia Daví, Cristina Gamboa, Laura Lluch and Núria Vila of Lacol (Spain)

Shortlisted

- Nerea Amorós Elorduy of Creative Assemblages (Uganda)
- Cristina Monteiro of DK-CM (UK)
- Verónica Villate of Mínimo Común (Paraguay)

==== 2022 ====
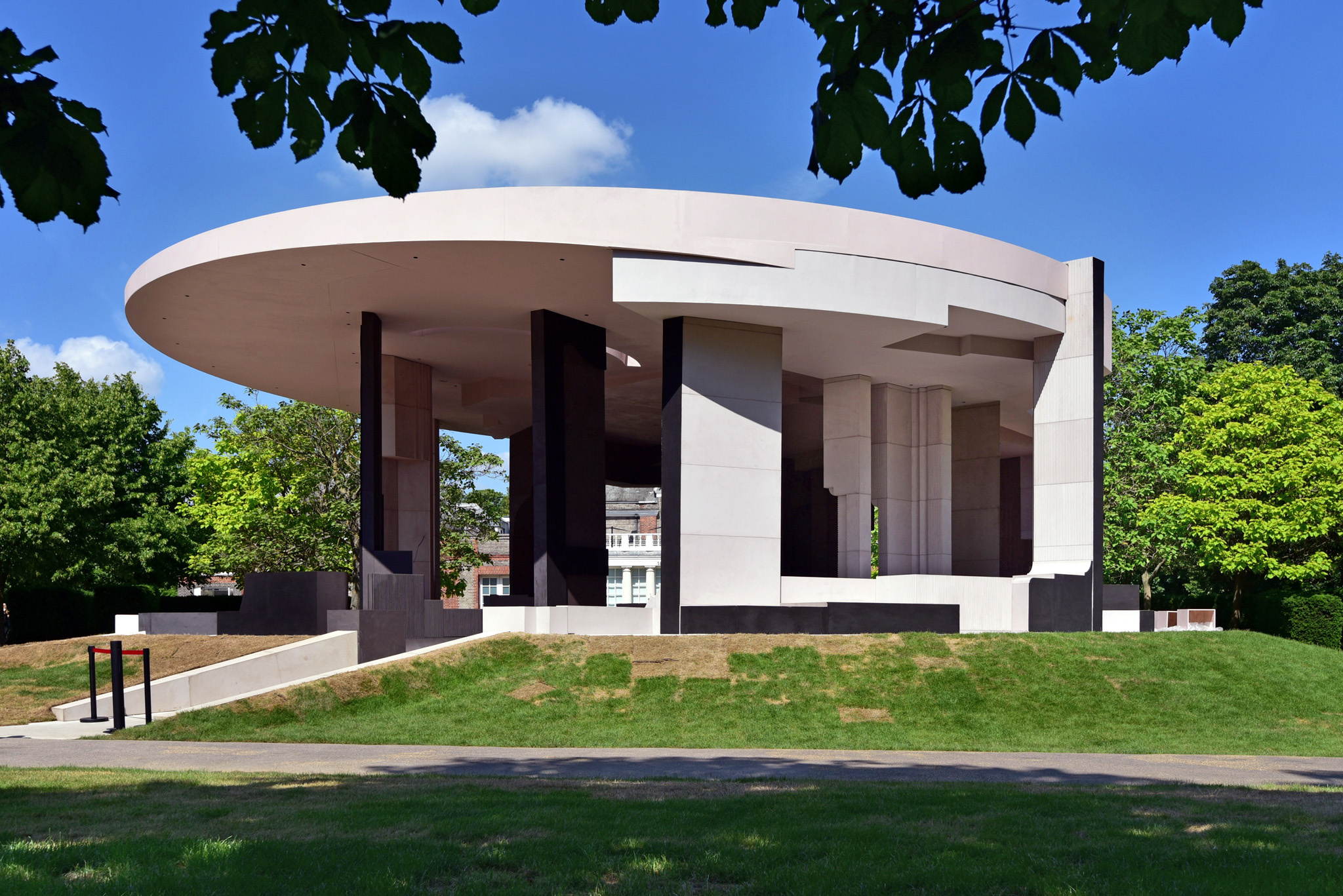
2021 Serpentine Pavilion by Sumayya Vally, Shortlisted 2022

Winner

- Swati Janu of Social Design Collaborative (India)

Shortlisted

- Ana Baptista of Colectivo Mel (Portugal)
- Rania Ghosn of Design Earth (USA)
- Sumayya Vally of Counterspace (South Africa)

==== 2023 ====
Winner

- Viviana Pozzoli of Equipo de Arquitectura (Paraguay)

Highly Commended

- Loreta Castro Reguera of Taller Capital (Mexico)

Shortlisted

- Alessandra Covini of Studio Ossidiana (Netherlands)
- Dominique Petit-Frère of Limbo Accra (Ghana / USA)

==== 2024 ====
Winner

- Nguyễn Hà of ARB Architects (Vietnam)

Highly Commended

- Noelia Monteiro of Estúdio Flume (Brazil)

Shortlisted

- Kim Courrèges of Plan Común (France)
- Joana Dabaj of Catalytic Action (Lebanon)

==== 2025 ====
Winner

- Sara Alissa and Nojoud Alsudairi of Syn Architects (Saudi Arabia)

Shortlisted

- Maríaluisa Borja of Al Borde (Ecuador)
- Ana Maria Gutiérrez of Organizmo (Colombia)
- Ashleigh Killa of The MAAK (South Africa)

==== 2026 ====
Winner

- Pooja Khairnar of PK Inception (India)

Shortlisted

- Jesica Amescua Carrera and Mariana Ordóñez Grajales of Comunal (Mexico)
- Hester van Dijk of Overtreders W (Netherlands)

== See also ==
- Wikipedia:FAQ/Article subjects (aimed at people depicted in Wikipedia articles)
- Jane Drew Prize (also part of the W Awards)
