= Sumayya Vally =

South African architect (born 1990)

Sumayya Vally (born 1990) is a South-African architect and business woman. Founder of the architecture and research firm, Counterspace.

== Early life and education ==
Sumayya Vally was born in February 1990 in Pretoria, South Africa, in the township of Laudium. She often cites the city of Johannesburg as her biggest source of inspiration, and it is a recurring theme in her works. Vally grew up in the suburbs of the Indian only township of Laudium and she attended a Muslim school for her primary education. Her grandfather of Indian origin migrated to South Africa in 1947.

Vally completed her undergraduate studies in Architecture at the University of Pretoria, and went on to complete her master's degree at the University of the Witwatersrand in 2014.

== Career ==
In 2014, Vally was admitted to the position of assistant curator and film producer for the South African Pavilion at La Biennale di Venezia. Between 2015 and 2020, she led the University of Johannesburg's Unit 12, An African Almanac, at the Graduate School of Architecture. The unit was founded by Professor Lesley Lokko, with the intent to create a curriculum for the African continent.

Alongside her teaching career, Vally co-founded the experimental architecture and research firm Counterspace in 2015. She established her own design studio Counterspace which she started collaborating with fellow friends and colleagues initially without much expectations. She started up the studio while completing her graduation in higher studies in 2015 and her intention was initially focusing on having a research oriented practice.

In 2020, the firm was appointed to design the 20th Serpentine Pavilion, making Vally the youngest architect to be commissioned for this acclaimed annual temporary structure. Her conception of the Serpentine Pavilion, erected in 2021, is a response to the historical erasure and scarcity of informal community spaces across the city of London, and pays homage to existing and erased places that have held communities over time and continue to do so.

Vally was included in the Time 100 Next list in 2021, which highlights 100 emerging leaders who are shaping the future. She was the only architect to make the list that year.

She was Pelli Distinguished Visiting professor at the University of Illinois Urbana-Champaign, a lecture series that brings internationally recognized architects together to serve as visiting lecturers each semester. In 2022, she delivered the 18th Geoffrey Bawa Memorial Lecture in Colombo after accepting an invitation from Sri Lankan authorities. She arrived in Sri Lanka in 2022 when the country was at crossroads with people protesting against price hikes and economic crisis and as a result her originally planned lecture could not take place at the scheduled venue and instead her lecture was live-streamed from the guest suite in the Bawa Colombo house off Bagatelle Road.

In 2023, Vally artistically directed and co-curated the inaugural Islamic Arts Biennale in Jeddah, Saudi Arabia. The event brings together many contemporary artists from across the world alongside rare artefacts, drawn together through the themes of Qiblah (direction) and Hijra (migration). That same year, she was appointed Honorary Professor of Practice at University College London’s The Bartlett School of Architecture. During her tenure, she will make her contribution to the Professional Practice Stream across The Bartlett School of Architecture and its Architecture MSci programme.

== Notable works ==
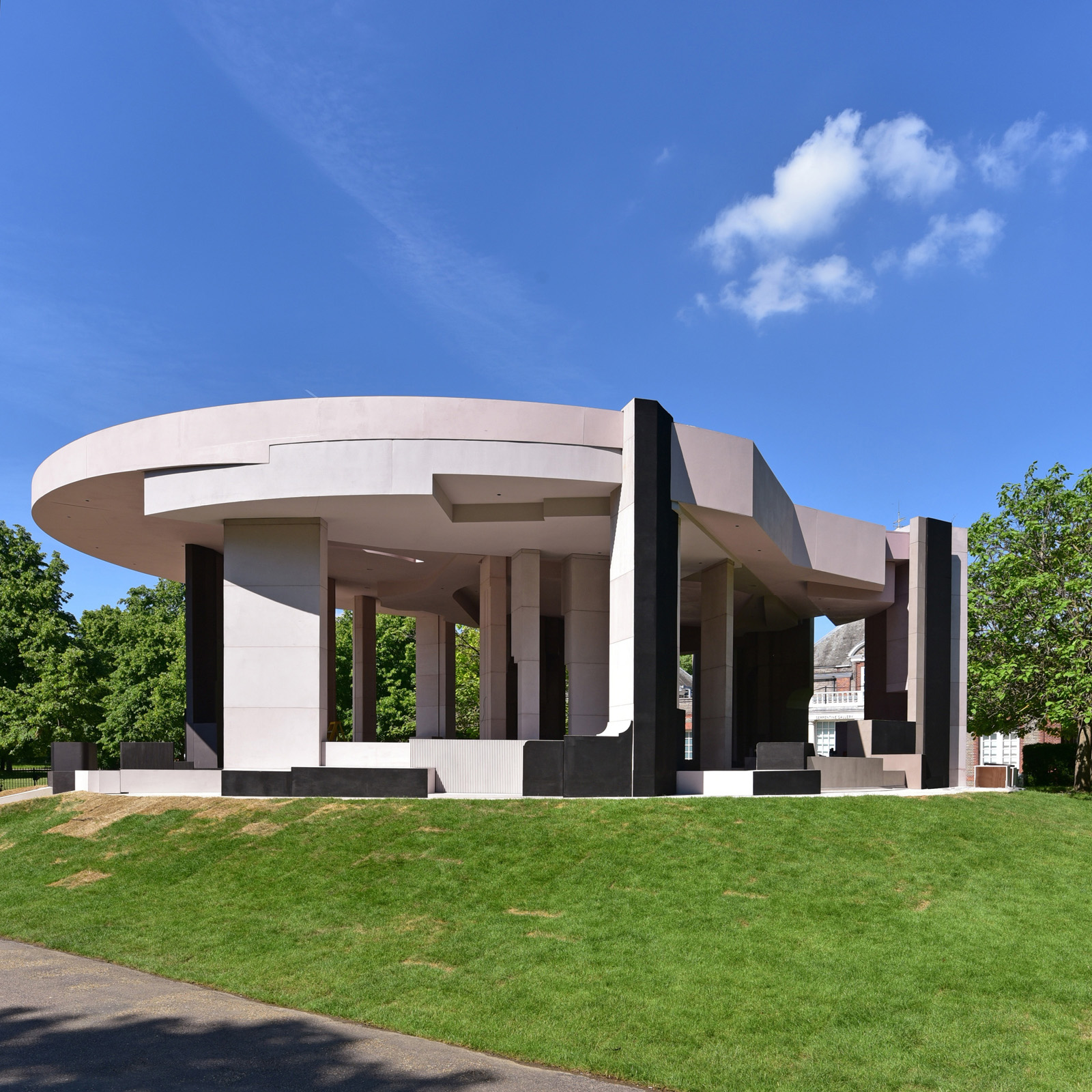
Vally's 2021 Serpentine Pavilion

=== Serpentine Pavilion ===
In 2021, Vally designed the 20th Serpentine Pavilion, making her the youngest architect to do so in the commission's history. The forms in the Pavilion are a result of abstracting, superimposing and splicing elements from architectures that vary in scales of intimacy, translating the shapes of London into the Pavilion structure in Kensington Gardens. Where these forms meet, they create a new place for gathering in the Pavilion She was also the only architect named on Times magazine list to be invited to design the Serpentine’s annual temporary summer pavilion on the grounds of Kensington Gardens in London.

The Pavilion is built of reclaimed steel, cork and timber covered with micro-cement. The varying textures, hues of pink and brown are drawn directly from the architecture of London and reference changes in quality of light

With this commission, Vally set out to create a representation of her ethos and practice by folding other voices into the pavilion. The Pavilion's design is based on past and present places of meeting, organising and belonging across several London neighbourhoods significant to diasporic and cross-cultural communities, including Brixton, Hoxton, Tower Hamlets, Edgware Road, Barking and Dagenham and Peckham, among others. Responding to the historical erasure and scarcity of informal community spaces across the city, the Pavilion references and pays homage to existing and erased places that have held communities over time and continue to do so today. Among them are: some of the first mosques built in the city, such as Fazl Mosque and East London Mosque, cooperative bookshops including Centerprise, Hackney; entertainment and cultural sites including The Four Aces Club on Dalston Lane, The Mangrove restaurant and the Notting Hill Carnival.

==== Fragments of the Pavilion ====
These places of gathering that inspired the design of the pavilion, were in turn incorporated by housing a fragment of the Serpentine Pavilion, taking the structure back out into the city. For the first time in the history of the Serpentine Pavilion commission, four fragments were placed in partner organisations. They are located in New Beacon Books in Finsbury Park, one of the first Black publishers and booksellers in the UK; a multi-purpose venue and community hub The Tabernacle in Notting Hill; arts centre the Albany in Deptford, and the new Becontree Forever Arts and Culture Hub at Valence Library in Barking and Dagenham, which was established to commemorate the centenary of the UK’s largest council housing estate.

The Fragments support the everyday operations of these organisations while enabling and honouring gatherings of local communities that they have supported for years. A gesture of decentralising architecture to include a multitude of voices, the Fragments extend out into the city the principles on which the Pavilion was designed.

==== Support Structures for Support Structures ====
An off-shoot of the 2021 Serpentine Pavilion, Support Structures for Support Structures is a fellowship programme initiated by the Serpentine in collaboration with Vally and Serpentine's Civic Projects programme. It was established to support artists working at the intersection of art, spatial politics and community practice.

=== Islamic Arts Biennale ===
Vally artistically directed the inaugural Islamic Arts Biennale in Jeddah, Saudi Arabia which ran from January through May 2023. In her role as Artistic Director, Vally was responsible for the development of the biennale's theme, concept, narrative, atmosphere, experience and theme identity, curation of contemporary commissions, and the direction and narrative of the spaces.

The biennale re-imagined Jeddah's Western Hajj Terminal at King Abdulaziz Airport, designed by Skidmore, Owings & Merrill. It presented more than forty contemporary works and over fifteen never-before-exhibited works, in addition to 280 artefacts, delivered by the Diriyah Biennale Foundation through a multi-sensorial experience.

In an interview with Arch Daily, Vally said of the Islamic Arts Biennale: "Since my practice is so centered and focused on finding design and aesthetic form and artistic expression for our identities, I really believe that it was very important to undertake a project like this, to claim, reclaim, configure, and reconfigure what this title is for the present and the future. I see it as a decolonial project, and I was really excited to be able to define it from these perspectives and voices."

== Awards and honours ==
=== 2023 ===
- Emerging Architect of the Year, Dezeen Awards
- One of Financial Times' 25 Women of the Year, 2023
- Honorary Fellow, Royal Architectural Institute of Canada
- Royal Academy Architecture Awards, Juror
- OBEL Awards, Juror
- Lexus Design Award, Mentor

=== 2022 ===
- World Economic Forum, Young Global Leader
- Moira Gemmill Prize for Emerging Architecture, Shortlist
- The World Around: Young Climate Prize, Design Champion
- Galerie’s 2022 Creative Minds
- African Futures Institute: Academic Advisor
- Dezeen’s Fifty Architects and Designers You Need to Know

=== 2021 ===
- Graham Foundation Recipient
- Rowan Moore’s Best Architecture of 2021 (Serpentine Pavilion)
- Best architecture of the year, selected by Oliver Wainwright, The Guardian (Serpentine Pavilion)
- TIME100 Next
- artnet 25 Inspiring Women in the Art World
- The Talks Emerging Masters
- SOM Foundation Jury Member, European Research Prize
- Dezeen Awards Jury Member

=== 2020 ===
- Domus Best Architecture Firms
- Architecture for a New Generation: Changemakers Manifestos, Design Museum
- Serpentine Pavilion
