= Avonni =

AVONNI is the national innovation award in Chile, created in 2007 by ForoInnovación foundation, along with Ministry of Economy and Televisión Nacional de Chile.

AVONNI select different organizations by their innovation in 16 categories: Food, New City, Design, Education, Social Entrepreneurship, Energy, Services Innovation, Industrial Innovación, Public Innovación, Environment, Mines, Natural Resources, Health, Culture y ICT.

Among the winners is Chilean architect Alejandro Aravena, and education company Poliglota
