= Prince Frederick of Prussia (1911–1966) =

Prussian prince

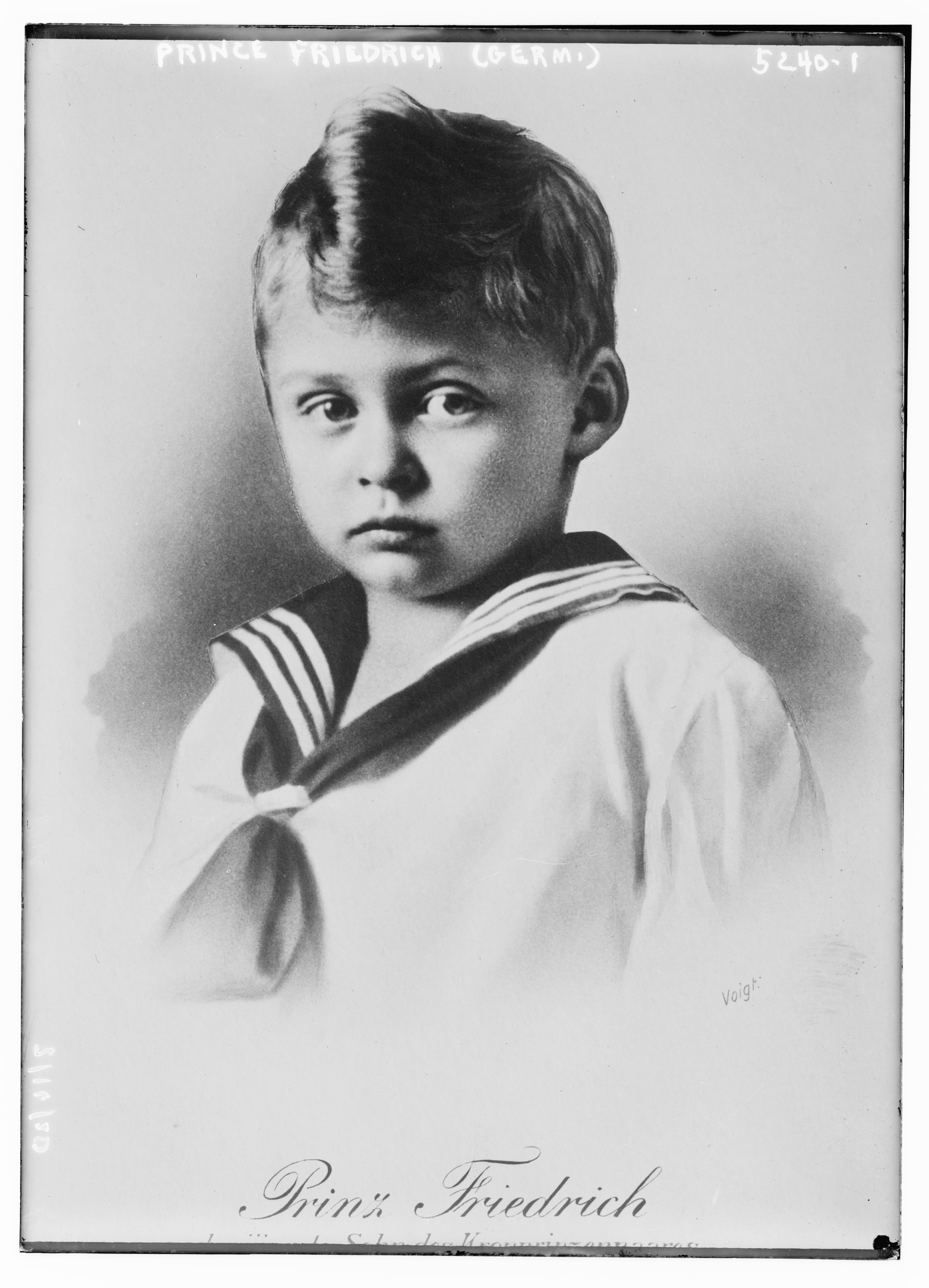
- Prince Frederick in 1915
- Born: 19 December 1911; Berlin, German Empire
- Died: 20 April 1966 (aged 54); Rhine River, West Germany
- Burial: 11 May 1966; Hohenzollern Castle, Württemberg-Hohenzollern, Germany
- Spouse: Lady Brigid Guinness (m. 1945)
- Issue Detail: Prince Nicholas; Prince Andreas; Princess Victoria Marina, Mrs. Achache; Prince Rupert; Princess Antonia, Duchess of Wellington
Names
- German: Friedrich Georg Wilhelm Christoph
- House: Hohenzollern
- Father: Wilhelm, German Crown Prince
- Mother: Duchess Cecilie of Mecklenburg-Schwerin

Prince Frederick George William Christopher of Prussia (German: Friedrich Georg Wilhelm Christoph Prinz von Preußen; 19 December 1911 – 20 April 1966), also known as Friedrich von Preussen in the United Kingdom, was the fourth son of Crown Prince Wilhelm of Germany and Duchess Cecilie of Mecklenburg-Schwerin.

== Marriage and issue ==
Prince Frederick married Lady Brigid Guinness on 30 July 1945 at Little Hadham. They had five children:

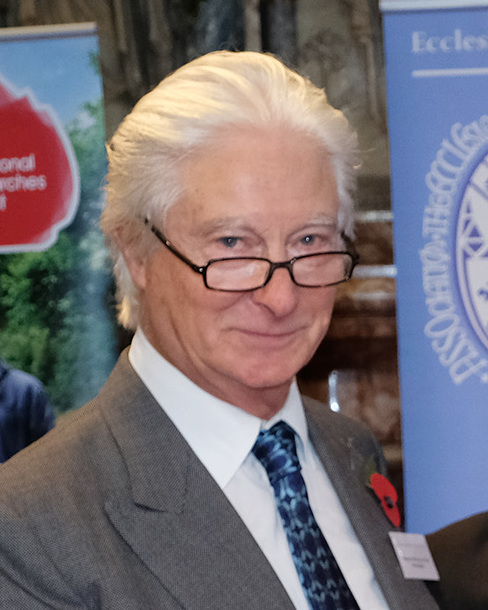
Prince Nicholas, the eldest son of Prince Frederick

- Prince Frederick Nicholas (b. 1946) married non-dynastically Hon. Victoria Lucinda Mancroft (daughter of Stormont Mancroft, 2nd Baron Mancroft) in 1980 in London, and has issue.
- Prince Andreas "Andrew" (b. 1947) married non-dynastically Alexandra Blahova in 1979 in London, and has issue, including Tatiana von Preussen.
- Princess Victoria Marina (b. 1952) married Philippe Alphonse Achache in 1976 in Albury, Hertfordshire, and has issue.
- Prince Rupert (b. 1955) married non-dynastically Ziba Rastegar-Javaheri in 1982 in London, and has issue.
- Princess Antonia (b. 1955), twin sister of Prince Rupert, who married Charles Wellesley, 9th Duke of Wellington, in 1977 at St. Paul's Church, London, and has issue, including Lady Mary and Lady Charlotte Wellesley.

== Studies in Britain and internment ==
He was studying at Cambridge and lived incognito as the Count von Lingen when World War II broke out in September 1939. He was arrested and interned in May 1940. He was held in Britain for several months and sent to internment camps near Quebec City and soon afterwards in Farnham, Quebec. In both camps, he was elected camp leader by fellow inmates.

== British naturalisation in 1947 ==
He renounced his German citizenship in 1947. He was naturalised as a British citizen in October 1947 under the name Friedrich von Preussen (having also been known during residence in the UK as "George Mansfield"). This naturalisation was controversial, in part because being a descendant of Sophia of Hanover, and having rights under the Act of Settlement 1701, as amended by the Sophia Naturalisation Act 1705, he had a claim to British citizenship from birth. His status in context of his claim for compensation for property seized in Poland was debated in Parliament and the law courts until 1961.

== Death ==
He was the owner of Reinhartshausen Castle in Erbach, Germany. While staying there in 1966, he went missing. His body was found two weeks later; he had drowned in the Rhine. Whether his death was suicide or an accident could not be determined.

== Ancestry ==
Ancestors of Prince Frederick of Prussia (1911–1966)

8. Frederick III, German Emperor
4. Wilhelm II, German Emperor
9. Victoria, Princess Royal
2. Wilhelm, German Crown Prince
10. Frederick VIII, Duke of Schleswig-Holstein
5. Princess Augusta Victoria of Schleswig-Holstein-Sonderburg-Augustenburg
11. Princess Adelheid of Hohenlohe-Langenburg
1. Prince Frederick of Prussia
12. Frederick Francis II, Grand Duke of Mecklenburg-Schwerin
6. Frederick Francis III, Grand Duke of Mecklenburg-Schwerin
13. Princess Augusta Reuss of Köstritz
3. Duchess Cecilie of Mecklenburg-Schwerin
14. Grand Duke Michael Nikolaevich of Russia
7. Grand Duchess Anastasia Mikhailovna of Russia
15. Princess Cecilie of Baden
