= Hollmén Reuter Sandman =

Architecture firm in Helsinki, Finland

Hollmén Reuter Sandman is an architecture firm based in Helsinki, Finland. Their work is focused on the design of community-based and environmentally-responsible interiors, architecture and urban planning in a variety of African and Asian countries including, but not limited to, Senegal, Tanzania and India. Their approach centers humanitarianism, regionality, collaboration, and ecological considerations.

== History ==
The founding partners and namesake of the firm are Saija Hollmén, Jenni Reuter and Helena Sandman. Their collaboration began in 1995 while the three were studying at the Helsinki University of Technology with the design of a Women’s Centre in Rufisque, Senegal which was completed in 2001. The project was focused on supporting women's collective action and went on to win the Bauwelt Prize in 2003. In 2007, the trio founded the NGO Ukumbi, which uses design and architecture to work and improve under-served groups in developing countries. Ukumbi is able to raise funds, share information with different networks and localities in ways that compliments and reinforce the approach to the design process. Ukumbi designs buildings in partnership with local communities, while sharing information with their builders on building techniques that the communities can use in the future. The word Ukumbi is Swahili which translates to mean forum or public meeting space. Hollmén Reuter Sandman assert that embracing a design methodology rooted in the local building traditions of economically disadvantaged nations serves as a pathway to guide the communities under consideration toward heightened self-sufficiency. Mere introduction of novel technologies to these underserved communities would merely engender a dependence upon these technologies, thus perpetuating a recurring cycle of reliance.

All three founding partners also teach at the Aalto University in Otaniemi. In 2016, the firm was invited to exhibit at the Venice Architecture Biennale. During the opening days of the exhibition, the trio discussed their ideas and approach to design, stating that their goal is to give:

"Voice to the ones who are not heard. Strength to the powerless, condidence to the quiet and to the ones who fear. In the course of time grows beauty, in beauty trust and dignity. Brick by brick, grant by grant – few are the architects where needed the most."

== Notable works ==
Their designs include the Women's Centre in Rufisque, TunaHAKI Centre in Moshi, Kilimanjaro Women Information Exchange and Consultancy Organization (KWIECO), Slowness Dignified exhibition in the 2016 Venice Architecture Biennale and the Nyan'goro Hostel in Tanzania.

== Awards ==
The firm has been recognized for their work through numerous exhibitions across Europe, Asia and North America as well as being included in publications such as the Architectural Review, The Finnish Architectural Review, World Architecture and Breaking Ground: Women in Architecture by Jane Hall. They have been shortlisted for the 2016 Moira Gemmill Prize for Emerging Architecture and numerous other architecture awards in addition to winning the: Pietilä Award given to young architects in 2002, Asko Avonius Award in 2012, Best Humanitarian of the Year Award in 2016 by DK Nordic Award/EOAW to Ukumbi NGO and the Architecture of Necessity Award in 2022.
