= Nathalie Rozencwajg =

Luxembourg-born architect

- Occupation: Architect
- Awards: RIBA Award for Town Hall Hotel RICS London Award for Building Conservation, Town Hall Hotel; RICS Project of the Year Award, Town Hall Hotel; Shortlisted, Dezeen Awards, Housing category for VI Castle Lane; Commended, AJ Emerging Woman Architect of the Year Award, Architects’ Journal Shortlisted, The Brit List 2018
- Practice: NAME architecture

Nathalie Rozencwajg (born October 1975) is a RIBA and RICS award-winning architect based in Paris and London.

== Career ==
Rozencwajg was born in Luxembourg, grew up in Brussels and studied at the Architectural Association School of Architecture (AA) in London, graduating in 2001. After an early career spent working in London and Paris, and on projects in Beijing, Athens and Mecca, Rozencwajg went on to co-found RARE architecture with Michel da Costa Goncalves in 2005, where she was a director for 12 years. From 2004 to 2016, Rozencwajg taught at the Architectural Association School of Architecture (AA) in London as a Unit Master.

In 2012, Rozencwajg was commended by Architects’ Journal for the AJ Emerging Woman Architect of the Year Award. In 2014, The Guardian newspaper noted Rozencwajg as one of "10 women in architecture to watch".

In 2018, Rozencwajg founded a new architectural practice, NAME architecture.

Rozencwajg lectures and leads architectural events internationally, including for the Architectural Association School of Architecture, Kansas State University, the glasstec International Trade Fair and the Fall Semester in Miami, for which she also produced an essay, Nathalie Rozencwajg: The Imagined and the Imaginary. She was also a contributor to the book Scale: imagination, perception, and practice in architecture (Routledge, ISBN 9780415687119) and to the journal A+u 536 15:05 London - Renewing Architecture & Cityscape (A+U Publishing, ISBN 4910019730552, ASIN B00TIVAXFE). In addition, Rozencwajg has contributed to the debate about the issues facing women in architecture, saying that “it's a pity to see so much talent that just doesn't fulfil itself”, and that long hours and the cost of childcare can be a factor.

== Notable work ==
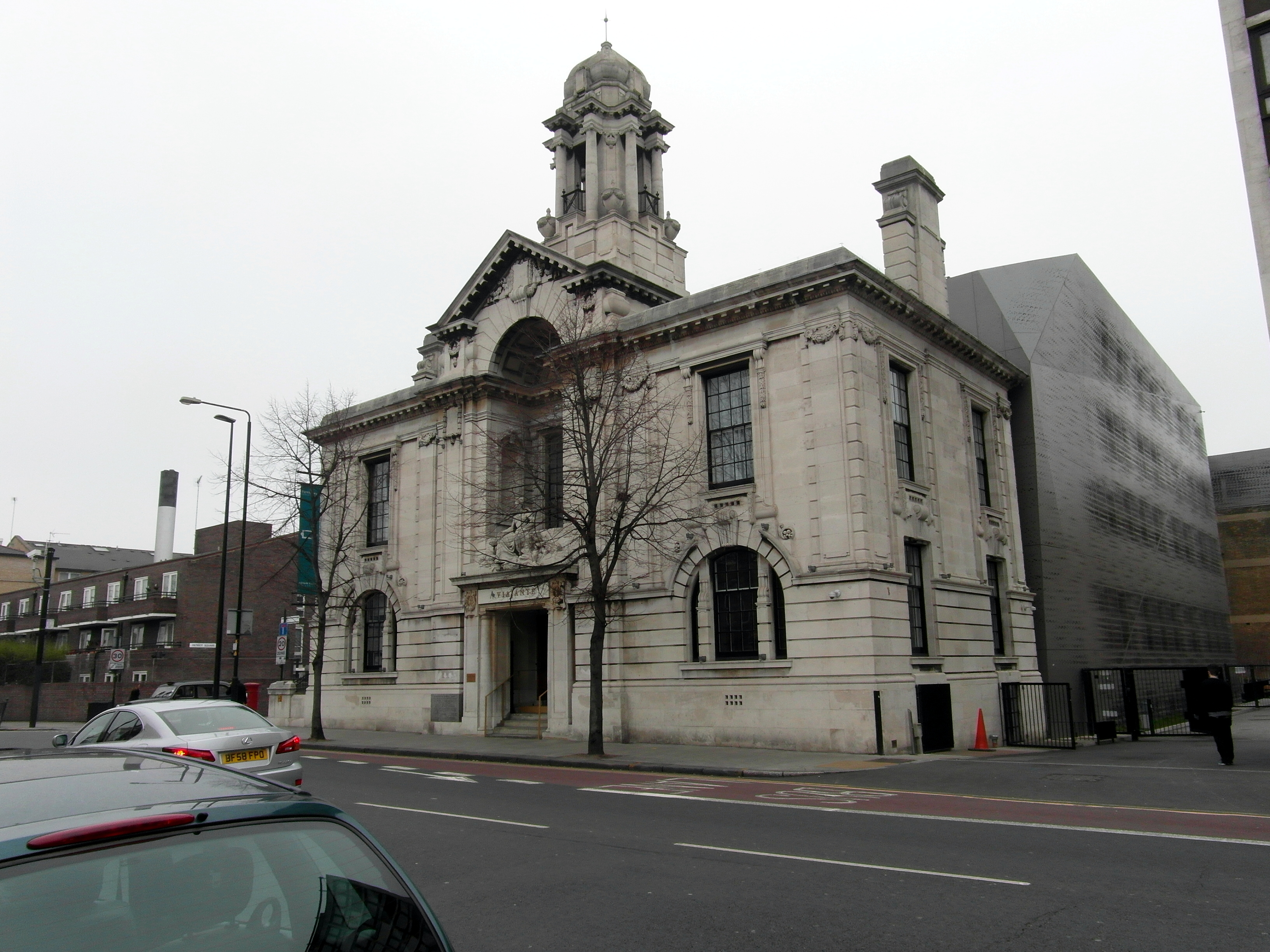
Bethnal Green Town Hall, London

Rozencwajg's architectural practice won the Royal Institution of Chartered Surveyors (RICS) Grand Final Building Conservation Award and the Project of the Year in 2011 for Bethnal Green Town Hall Hotel, a 98-room luxury hotel in Hackney London. The Town Hall – originally built in 1910 and extended in 1937 – is a Grade II listed building, and now has a laser-cut aluminium ‘skin’ added to its existing structure, which conceals a new floor. Several sculptures by Henry Poole were retained in the development, which also included a bar and restaurant area called Viajante for former elBulli chef Nuno Mendes. The building also won a RIBA Award. The Times said: “The makeover is in a modern manner but done with respect for the old work, which is either conserved intact or set off by startling interventions.” Sleeper Magazine said: “The Town Hall Hotel & Apartments combines a visionary extension and sensitive restoration of the building, which has stood in the heart of London's East End since Edwardian times.”

Rozencwajg is also responsible for the CentralFestival EastVille shopping mall and fashion arcade in Bangkok, Porte 12 restaurant in Paris – owned by André Chiang and run by Vincent Crepel, and Londrino restaurant for chef Leandro Carreira. Londrino has been shortlisted for the Restaurant & Bar Design Awards. Wallpaper* magazine said Rozencwajg “created a simple, slick space that carefully considers the refined craftsmanship of Londrino's food.”

Rozencwajg is also known for the design of high-end apartments in Westminster's Castle Lane – in the Birdcage Conservation Area – and the innovative reinterpretation of the classic bow window. Architectures CREE magazine said: “Innovation exists in tradition. Cultural heritage is strongly present in this bow window concept. The double bend forms a thick façade to create a revisited form of the bow window.”

Rozencwajg taught at the Architectural Association School of Architecture (AA) from 2004 until 2016. This includes a first year unit (2004-2007) and intermediate unit 4 (2007-2016). She was Head of AA Singapore Visiting School from 2006 to 2016. As part of a workshop for the AA, Rozencwajg and Valentin Bontjes van Beek led a student project, "The Crossings Project", to build an experimental footbridge at Hooke Park a 142-hectare woodland in Dorset, South West England. It was funded by the Custerson Award.

== Awards ==
- Commended, 2012 AJ Emerging Woman Architect of the Year Award, Architects’ Journal
- RIBA Award, Town Hall Hotel
- RICS London Award for Building Conservation, Town Hall Hotel
- RICS Project of the Year Award, Town Hall Hotel
- Shortlisted, Dezeen Awards, Housing category for VI Castle Lane
- Shortlisted, The Brit List 2018
- Architect of the Year, The Brit List 2018
