= Qatari pavilion =

Venice Biennale national pavilion

The Qatari Pavilion serves as a national pavilion of the Venice Biennale, accommodating the official representation of Qatar throughout the duration of the exhibition.

== Background ==
The Venice Biennale is an international art biennial exhibition held in Venice, Italy. Often described as "the Olympics of the art world", participation in the Biennale is a prestigious event for contemporary artists. The festival has become a constellation of shows: a central exhibition curated by that year's artistic director, national pavilions hosted by individual nations, and independent exhibitions held throughout Venice. The Biennale's parent organisation also runs regular festivals in other arts: architecture, dance, film, music and theatre.

Outside the central international exhibition, individual nations produce their own shows, known as pavilions, as their national representation. Nations that own their pavilion buildings – such as the 30 housed in the Giardini – are responsible for their own upkeep and construction costs as well. Nations without dedicated buildings create pavilions in venues throughout the city.

== Building ==
In 2024, Qatar Museums and the Venice government agreed to build their relationships and cultural exchange in a Protocol of Cooperation. The Qatari pavilion was the first new permanent national pavilion built in the Giardini della Biennale in 30 years. Permanent additions to the Giardini are sparing, with Qatar being only the third country in 50 years to open a permanent pavilion, following Australia in 1973 and Korea in 1995. The pavilion is centrally located in the Giardini, near its Book Pavilion.

Lina Ghotmeh is the building's architect. No completion date has been announced.

== Exhibitions ==
The inaugural exhibition was an installation on the future pavilion's site, showing Pakistani artist Yasmeen Lari's Community Center during the 2025 Venice Biennale of Architecture. Qatar held a second exhibition at ACP-Palazzo Franchetti showcasing 20 architects from the MENASA region (Middle East and North Africa and South Asia). Artist Rirkrit Tiravanija 's exhibition at the 2026 Venice Biennale of Art took place in a tent at the pavilion's site.

=== Art ===
#	Year	Artist(s)	Curator(s)	Show notes	Ref
61st	2026	Rirkrit Tiravanija	Tom Eccles, Ruba Katrib	"Untitled (a gathering of remarkable people)"	

=== Architecture ===
#	Year	Artist(s)	Curator(s)	Show notes	Ref
19th	2025	Yasmeen Lari	Aurélien Lemonier, Sean Anderson, Virgile Alexandre	"Beyti Beytak. My home is your home. La mia casa è la tua casa." Lari's Community Center is meant to showcase exchange across the MENASA region.	

== Bibliography ==
- Russeth, Andrew (April 17, 2019). "The Venice Biennale: Everything You Could Ever Want to Know". ARTnews. Archived from the original on April 20, 2019.
