= Moira Gemmill =

Arts administrator in London

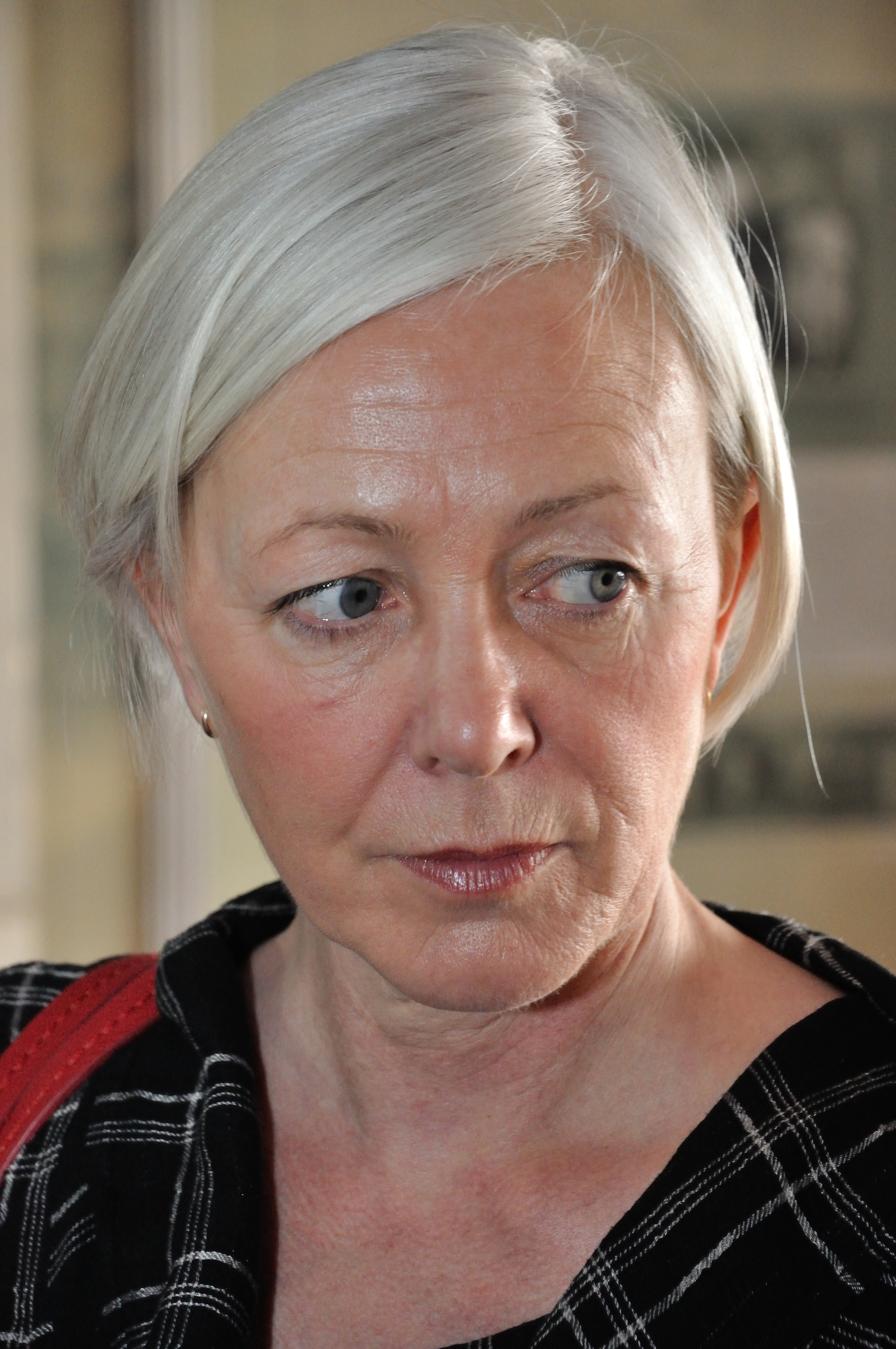
- Moira Gemmill
- Born: 18 September 1959; Kintyre, Scotland
- Died: 9 April 2015 (aged 55)
- Known for: Arts administration

Moira Gemmill (18 September 1959 – 9 April 2015) was head of design and exhibitions at the Museum of London and director of design at the Victoria and Albert Museum from 2002 until early 2015. Shortly before her death, in February 2015, she had been appointed to the job of director of capital programmes at the Royal Collection Trust. Gemmill died after being in a collision with a lorry at the Millbank roundabout, near Lambeth Bridge, while cycling from her home at Kennington to her job at St James's Palace.

On 20 April 2015, campaign group Stop Killing Cyclists held a vigil at the site of Gemmill's death to protest the number of cyclists dying on British roads.

== Moira Gemmill Prize for Emerging Architecture ==
The Moira Gemmill Prize for Emerging Architecture, awarded yearly since 2016 as part of the Women in Architecture Awards by the The Architectural Review and the Architects' Journal, was named in memory of Moira Gemmill.
