= Philip Womack =

British writer and journalist

Philip Womack (born in 1981) is a British writer and journalist. Womack married Princess Tatiana von Preussen in 2014.

== Education ==
Womack was educated at Dorset House Preparatory School, Lancing College, BPP Law School, and read classics and English at Oriel College, Oxford.

== Career ==
Womack has written for The Daily Telegraph, The Times, The Times Literary Supplement, The Spectator, The Tablet, The New Humanist and The First Post.

His first novel, The Other Book, was published in January 2008, by Bloomsbury Publishing. His second novel, The Liberators, was published by Bloomsbury in February 2010. He authored a trilogy of fantasy novels under the series title The Darkening Path. The books in the trilogy are The Broken King, The King's Shadow, and The King's Revenge, which were published in 2014, 2015, and 2016 respectively. The Double Axe, a retelling of the Minotaur myth, was published in 2016. The Arrow of Apollo, a book on the stories of the children of Orestes and Aenea, was published in May 2020. The author's first non-fiction book, How to Teach Classics to Your Dog: A Quirky Introduction to the Ancient Greeks and Romans, was published in October 2020.
