= Lina Ghotmeh =

Lebanese-born architect (born 1980)

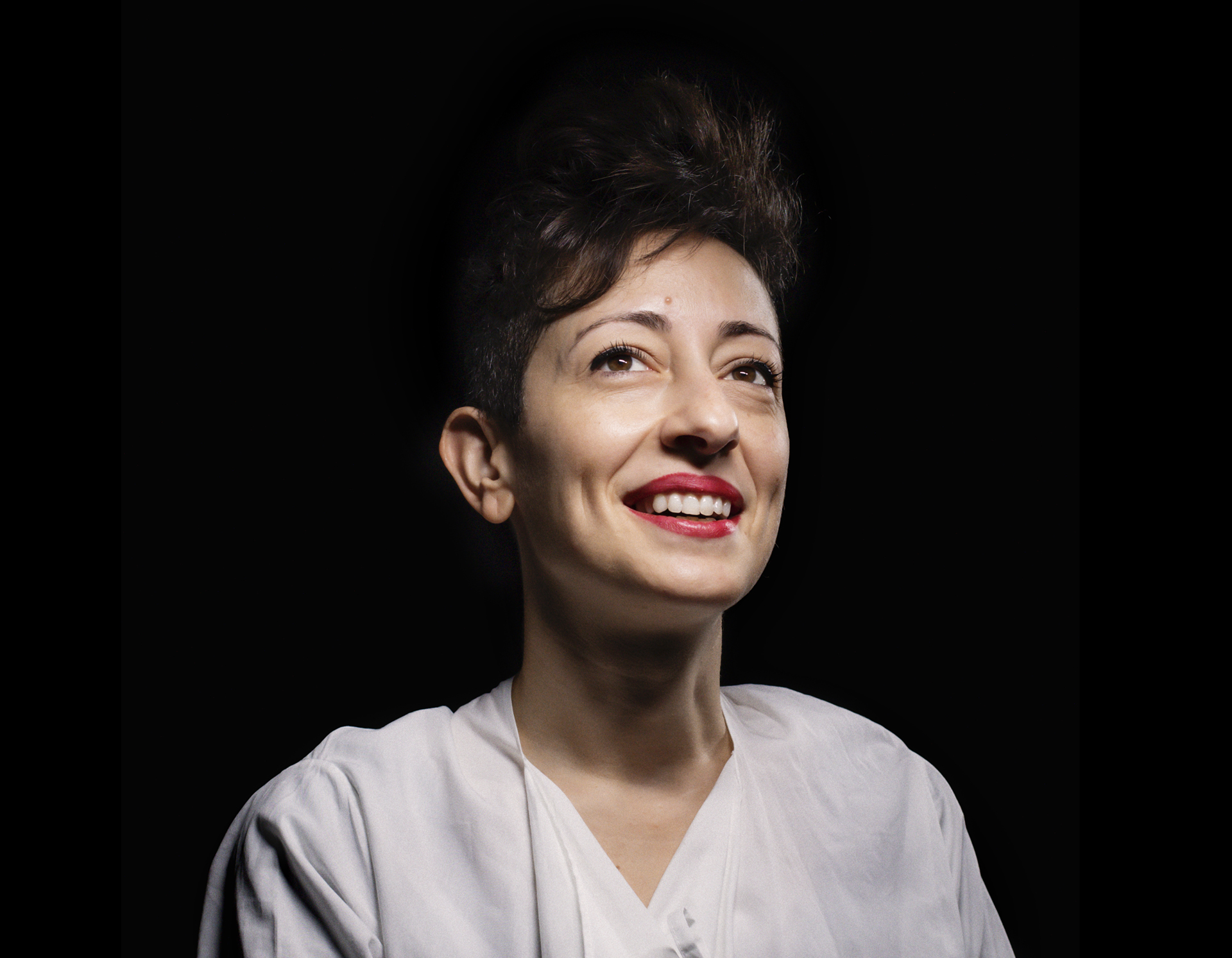
- Ghotmeh in 2021
- Born: 2 July 1980 (age 46); Beirut, Lebanon
- Education: American University of Beirut; École spéciale d'architecture
- Occupation: Architect
- Awards: 2020 Erich Schelling Architecture Prize
- Practice: Lina Ghotmeh – Architecture
- Website: linaghotmeh.com/en/

Lina Ghotmeh (born 2 July 1980) is a Lebanese-born architect and founder of Lina Ghotmeh Architecture in Paris. Raised in Beirut, her work emphasizes sustainability, history, and materiality, integrating traditional techniques with contemporary design.

Notable projects include the redesign of the Western Range galleries of the British Museum in London; the Qatari pavilion of La Biennale di Venezia; the Bahrain Pavilion for Expo 2025; the 22nd Serpentine Pavilion in London (2023); Ateliers Hermès (2023) in Normandy, France's first low-carbon, energy-positive industrial building,; Stone Garden Housing tower in Beirut (2020); and the Estonian National Museum in Tartu (2016). Lina Ghotmeh's work was exhibited in various institution including the MAXXI and the 17th & the 19th International Architecture Exhibition of La Biennale di Venezia.

In 2023, she designed the Serpentine Pavilion, becoming the fourth woman to do so since Zaha Hadid's inaugural structure in 2000. She has received multiple awards, including the 2020 Schelling Architecture Award, and the 2023 Architecture and Design Award from the Great Arab Minds initiative in the UAE.

== Biography ==
=== Early life and education ===
Ghotmeh was born in 1980 and grew up in Beirut after the Lebanese Civil War. At a young age, she was introduced to building design with a mother trained as an architect and a father who is a contractor. At university in Beirut in the early 2000s, Ghotmeh initially wanted to be an archaeologist, and this interest in history, identity, and memory are common themes of her work.

Having grown up in the Middle East, Ghotmeh's architecture draws inspiration from the diverse civilizations that have shaped her home. She delves into the rich history of a place, and her knowledge of climatic architecture, especially that of the Arab region, results in culturally and environmentally sensitive projects.

Ghotmeh graduated from the American University of Beirut with a bachelor's degree in architecture with distinction in 2003. In her third year as an architecture student, she received the Fawzi W. Azar Award as a scholarship and the Areen Prize for her diploma project. In 2001 she left Lebanon for an internship in Paris to collaborate with the Ateliers of Jean Nouvel where she worked on the Doha High Rise in Qatar. After completing her studies in 2003, she moved back to Paris to continue working with Jean Nouvel and then in collaboration with Norman Foster of Foster and Partners in London. In 2005, in London, Ghotmeh worked separately on the creation of the Estonian National Museum with fellow architects Dan Dorell and Tsuyoshi Tane, and the trio established Dorell Ghotmeh Tane/ Architects (DGT) in 2006 after winning the museum competition. Completed in 2016, the museum was nominated for the European Union Prize for Contemporary Architecture Mies van der Rohe Award and won the AFEX Grand Prize, which is awarded every two years for significant buildings around the world built by French architects.

Between 2007 and 2015, Ghotmeh taught architecture as an associate professor in Paris at the École spéciale d'Architecture and obtained a master's degree in architecture during the same period.

=== Career ===
In 2016, Ghotmeh established her eponymous architecture firm Lina Ghotmeh — Architecture in Paris in the 11th arrondissement. Her work is framed around “Archaeology of the Future” which she has coined, due to its historical and materially sensitive research. Her early research and work include an investigative installation at the first Sharjah Architecture Triennale where she explored the rejuvenation of Sharjah's urban courtyards, a carbon-neutral minimal dwelling as part of Hotel Metropole exhibition at the Pavillon de l'Arsenal in Paris, and Les Grands Verres restaurant at Paris contemporary art museum Palais de Tokyo. For the Palais de Tokyo, unveiled in 2017, “Ghotmeh selected natural surfaces that perpetuate the sustainable spirit, including a 60-foot bar made from compacted earth,” according to the Wall Street Journal.

In 2020, the architect completed the sculptural, sand-toned concrete tower in Beirut, Stone Garden, which was awarded Dezeen Project of the Year in 2021. Large openings across the geometric construction are filled with plants: “They transform the scars into moments of life,” Ghotmeh told The National. Stone Garden is her first architectural project in her hometown of Beirut, and it's designed to echo the resilience and long history of the city, which has been inhabited, destroyed, colonized, and rebuilt across centuries. The building withstood the August 2020 explosion that destroyed a large part Beirut.

In 2021 Ghotmeh unveiled a 6-foot model version of Stone Garden for the Venice Architecture Biennale. “This mix of elements nod to Lebanon’s history of war and violence while creating community (or, as Ms. Ghotmeh put it, “orchestrating life”), celebrating and nurturing local craft, and encouraging outdoor living, nature and a sense of hope and healing,” according to The New York Times. The model was subsequently exhibited at Rome’s MAXXI as part of the exhibition Good News Women in Architecture, alongside works of Zaha Hadid and Kazuyo Sejima and at Cooper Hewitt, Smithsonian Design Museum in New York for the exhibition, Designing Peace, which is currently at San Francisco at the Museum of Craft and Design.

In 2022, Ghotmeh was appointed architect of the 22nd Serpentine Pavilion that was unveiled at Kensington Gardens in the summer of 2023. Dubbed "À table," it was built of wood in a circular shape, with a majlis-like assembly (traditional Arabic sitting rooms) to encourage coming together, and designed to be fully demountable and reusable.

The 2023 Serpentine Pavilion has received mixed critical responses. Writing in Architectural Record, journalist Tim Abrahams praised its structural rhythm, proportions and provision for social interaction, while expressing reservation about its detailing. Robert Bevan, reviewing the pavilion for the Evening Standard, praised its execution but questioned its architectural experimentation and whether its arrangement of the tables fulfilled its stated ambitions for conviviality.

That same year Ghotmeh also delivered with her practice the Hermès leather workshop in Normandy, France, which revives the region's traditional construction material of brick. “Not only is brick a local material, it’s made by hand and is dimensioned for manual use, so its presence in the architecture reflects the trace of the hand in Hermès’s craft manufacture,” Ghotmeh told Architectural Record. The project is the first low-carbon, energy-positive manufacturing building in France.

Ghotmeh frequently designs with bio-sourced, geo-sourced natural materials including stone, sand and timber. She has a considerate approach that focuses on ecology, renewal and longevity regarding the built environment. Her firm is leading a timber tower in Paris, Réalimenter Masséna, which is a winner of the call for innovative projects initiated by Mayor Anne Hidalgo. Ghotmeh is also constructing low-carbon housing for the athletes' village for the 2024 Olympic Games in Paris.

The future contemporary Art Museum in Saudi Arabia (AlUla) is also being designed by Ghotmeh in the ancient Arabic oasis city Al-'Ula in the North West of Saudi Arabia. Based on a series of pavilions nestled within the lush surrounds, the design came to life after the architect conducted workshops to better understand the people and their customs, particularly their connection to the land and the site.

=== Teaching ===
Ghotmeh has lectured at the world's leading universities and is an appointed professor member of the International Academy of Architecture (IAA). She holds the Kenzo Tange Design Critic 2024 teaching position at Harvard. In 2021 Ghotmeh was Louis I. Kahn Visiting professor of Architectural Design at the Yale School of Architecture and Gehry Chair 2021–22 at the University of Toronto, Canada.

She has publicly presented her research and work at several notable universities as well, namely at Massachusetts Institute of Technology (MIT) and Harvard Graduate School of Design (GSD) both in fall 2023. Also that year, Ghotmeh presented at London's Architectural Association School of Architecture (AA), Sensitive Spaces, showcasing her practice's use of historical research for architecture that is connected to its past and forward-thinking in its sustainability.

Ghotmeh co-presides the European Union initiative RST ARCHES for advancing scientific and architectural innovation and research in extreme climates. The foundation is administered by the National School of Architecture of Strasbourg (ENSAS) and its joint laboratory with the National Institute of Applied Sciences (INSA) of Strasbourg.

She has also been a jury member for competitions, for example, the AR House 2023 Architecture Review Award the Aga Khan Award for Architecture 2022, and the Holcim Foundation Awards 2025 competition for sustainable design, as chair of the regional jury for Middle East & Africa.

== Projects ==
=== 2026 ===
- Milan Design Week 2026, MoscaPartners Pavilion, Metamorphosis in Motion

=== 2025 ===
- Jadids’ Legacy Museum (former home of Usmon Khodjaev), Bukhara, Uzbekistan (ongoing)
- Western Range, British Museum, London, United Kingdom
- Museum am Rothenbaum (MARKK), Hamburg, Germany
- Bahrain Pavilion, Expo Osaka, Japan
- Qatar's Permanent Pavilion at the Giardini, Venice, Italy
- Exhibition Olga de Amaral, Institute of Contemporary Art, Miami, United States

=== 2024 ===
- Olympic Athletes’ Village, Saint Denis, France
- Exhibition Olga de Amaral, Fondation Cartier pour l’art contemporain, Paris, France
- Artists residence, Kadist Foundation, Paris, France
- SOPIC Offices, Tarbes, France

=== 2023 ===
- AlUla Contemporary Arts Museum, AlUla, Saudi Arabia (ongoing)
- Hermès workshops in Normandy, France
- Serpentine Pavilion, London, United Kingdom

=== 2022 ===
- PHI Contemporain museum, Québec, Canada (conceptual project)

=== 2021 ===
- Stone Garden, Resilient Living: An Archeology of the Future, 17th Biennale Architettura, Venice, Italy
- Sara Hildén Art Museum, Tampere, Finland (conceptual project)
- Shenzhen Antuo Hill Museums, Shenzhen, China (conceptual project)

=== 2020 ===
- Stone Garden housing and center for Middle Eastern studies, Beirut, Lebanon

=== 2019 ===
- “Wonderlab” Exhibition, Beijing, China
- "Low Carbon Room", Hotel Metropole, Paris, France
- The Okura Tokyo hotel – Installation, Tokyo, Japan
- Montparnasse urban rehabilitation, Paris, France with Rogers Stirk & Partners (ongoing)

=== 2018 ===
- Boutique Patrick Roger, Paris, France
- “Wonderlab” Exhibition, Tokyo, Japan
- Museum Archive of Saradar Collection, Mar Chaaya, Lebanon(ongoing)
- Museum of the Dignity Revolution, Kyiv, Ukraine (conceptual project)
- "Into the Vines", Winery Hotel, Kefraya, Libya (ongoing)
- Wazanova Exhibition, Arita, Japan
- "Travel Travel(lers)" 21_21 Design Sight P. Roger Sculptures Exhibition, Tokyo, Japan

=== 2016 ===
- Réalimenter Masséna, Réinventer Paris, France (on hold)
- Les Grands Verres restaurant, Palais de Tokyo, Paris, France
- Estonian National Museum, Tartu, Estonia with DGT

=== 2015 ===
- A House for Oiso, Oiso, Japan, with DGT

=== 2014 ===
- Hokusai, at Grand Palais, Paris France, with DGT

== Awards and recognitions ==
=== 2026 ===
- Chevalier of Arts and Letters, French Ministry of Culture
- Honorary Fellow of the American Institute of Architects (Hon. FAIA)
- Wallpaper* Architect of the Year
- ArchDaily Awards – Building of the Year: The Bahrain Pavilion, Expo 2025 Osaka
- BIG SEE Architecture Award: Serpentine Pavilion ‘À table’

=== 2025 ===
- TIME100 Next, Rising Stars
- Iconic Awards Architect of the Year
- Gold Award, Best Architecture & Landscape Expo 2025 Osaka: Bahrain Pavilion
- Global Design & Architecture Design Awards 2025: Bahrain Pavilion, Expo 2025 Osaka (Pop-Ups and Temporary category)

=== 2023 ===
- Great Arab Minds, Architecture and Design Award
- French Design 100 Award – Serpentine Pavilion
- OPAL Award – Winner, Architectural Design, Historical
- Shortlisted Architect of the Year by Dezeen
- Nominated Equerre d’Argent – Lieux d’activité
- AD 100 Italia
- AD 100 Middle East
- AD100 US
- Nominated Equerre d’Argent (Silver Square) – Places of activity

=== 2022 ===
- French Design 100 Award

=== 2021 ===
- IAA Academy Professor
- RST Arches Scientific Network
- Dezeen Award Best Architecture Project of the Year, Stone Garden

=== 2020 ===
- Schelling Architecture Prize
- Tamayouz, Woman of Outstanding Achievement Award

=== 2019 ===
- French Fine Arts Academy Pierre Cardin Award
- World Architecture News Awards
- Nominated for the Moira Gemmill Prize for Emerging Architecture 2019

=== 2018 ===
- Dezeen Awards 2018 shortlisted
- French Design 100 Award
- 2A Magazine Awards 2018
- European Museum of the Year 2018
- 40/40 European Architecture and Design Award

=== 2017 ===
- Le Fooding Guide Awards 2018
- Estonian Architecture Awards 2017

=== 2016 ===
- French Academy of Architecture, Silver Medal Dejean Prize
- AFEX Grand Prize, Estonian National Museum
- Nominated for Mies van der Rohe Award, Estonian National Museum

=== 2008 ===
- Award “Nouveaux albums des jeunes architectes”

== Bibliography ==
- Windows of Light, Lina Ghotmeh, Lars Müller Publishers, 2024.
- Lina Ghotmeh: The Archeologist of the Future, Chiara Rizzi, Gangemi Editore, 2024.
- Andreini, Laura (ed.). Gender Gap. Florence, Italy: Forma Edizioni, 2021.
- Aramouny, Carla and Mona Fawaz. "Grange progetto: Lina Ghotmeh Architecture in Libano = Grand Project: Lina Ghotmeh Architecture in Lebanon." Domus no. 1045 (April 2020): 26–40.
- Astbury, Jon. "Secrets and lives." Architectural Review 240 no. 1435 (October 2016): 44–48.
- "Estonian National Museum in Tartu: Dorell. Ghotmeh. Tane / Architects, Paris, Grosschimidt Arhitektuur, Tallinn." Detail (English Ed.) no. 1 (January 2017): 50–55.
- Ghandour Atallah, Joumana. "A sheltering place: damaged by the Beirut blast, Lina Ghotmeh's new residential tower is a product of its highly charged context." Architectural Record 208 no. 10 (October 2020): 88–93.
- "Lina Ghotmeh, "AV Proyectos no. 114 (2022). Madrid, Spain: Arquitectura Viva.
