= Princess Antonia, Duchess of Wellington =

British aristocrat and philanthropist

Princess Antonia
- Duchess of Wellington, Princess of Waterloo, (more)
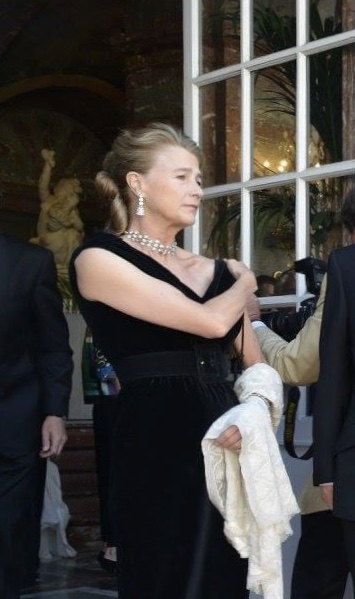
- Antonia in 2015
- Born: Antonia Elizabeth Brigid Louise Mansfeld of Prussia; 28 April 1955 (age 71); London, England
- Spouse: Charles Wellesley, 9th Duke of Wellington (m. 1977)
- Issue: 5, including Lady Mary Wellesley and Lady Charlotte Wellesley
Names
- Antonia Elizabeth Brigid Louise Mansfeld
- House: Hohenzollern (by birth), Wellesley (by marriage)
- Father: Prince Friedrich of Prussia
- Mother: Lady Brigid Guinness
- Occupation: Philanthropist

Princess Antonia of Prussia, Duchess of Wellington and Princess of Waterloo (Antonia Elizabeth Brigid Louise Mansfeld; born 28 April 1955) is a British aristocrat and philanthropist. A member of the House of Hohenzollern by birth, she is a great-granddaughter of Wilhelm II, German Emperor and a great-great-great-granddaughter of Queen Victoria of the United Kingdom. Through her marriage, she is also the Princess of Waterloo, Duchess of Victoria, Duchess of Ciudad Rodrigo, Marchioness of Douro, Marchioness of Torres Vedras, Countess of Mornington , Countess of Vimeiro, Viscountess Wellesley and Baronness Wellington of Stratfield Saye. She is the president of The Guinness Partnership, an affordable housing community benefit society in the United Kingdom.

== Early life and education ==
Antonia Elizabeth Brigid Louise Mansfeld was born in London on 28 April 1955, the daughter of Prince Frederick of Prussia and his wife, Lady Brigid Guinness. On her father's side, she is a great-granddaughter of the German Emperor Wilhelm II, and granddaughter of Rupert Guinness, 2nd Earl of Iveagh on her mother's side. She has a twin brother, Rupert.

She was educated at Cobham Hall School and King's College London, where she earned a bachelor's degree in English.

Styles of Princess Antonia, The Duchess of Wellington
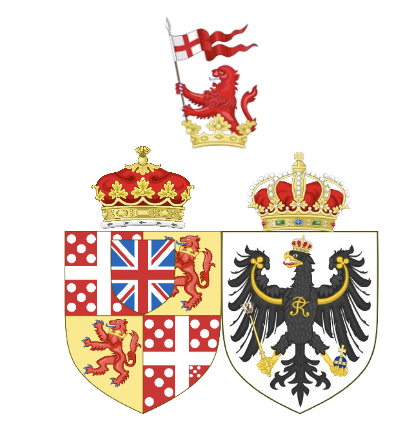
- Reference style: Her Royal Highness
- Spoken style: Your Royal Highness

== Career ==
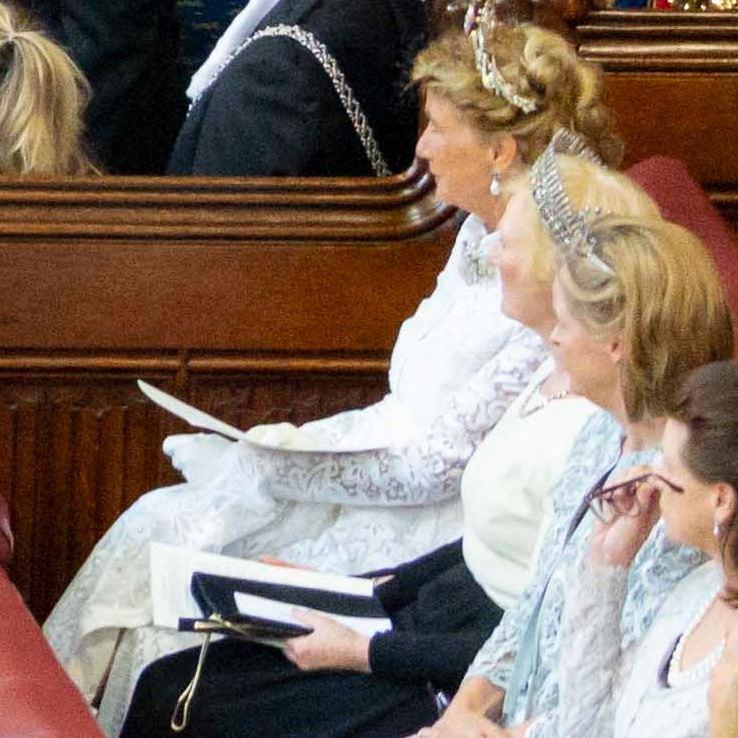
Antonia attending the 2024 State Opening of Parliament

In 2007, she was appointed as the President of The Guinness Partnership, an affordable housing charitable society in the United Kingdom, and was appointed an Officer of the Order of the British Empire in the 2008 Birthday Honours for services to social housing. Prior to serving as president, she had been a member of the Partnership's Board of Trustees since 1976.

In 2008, Antonia was appointed as a fellow of Eton College, serving as a member of the college's governing body. She is also a fellow of King's College, London. She opened Maggi Hambling's War Requiem & Aftermath, a cultural exhibition at King's College.

In 2009, she became the Chairwoman of the Royal Ballet School, serving until December 2019. As chairwoman, she helped lead the school's Healthy Dancer Programme and fundraised for the school's academic programs.

In 2023, Antonia attended the Coronation of Charles III and Camilla, where her husband carried Queen Mary's Crown in the royal procession. Later that year, she sat in the royal carriage with King Charles III and Queen Camilla in the King's procession at Royal Ascot.

== Personal life ==
On 3 February 1977, Antonia married Charles Wellesley, Marquess of Douro at St Paul's Church, Knightsbridge in London. Notable guests at the wedding included Queen Elizabeth the Queen Mother, Charles, Prince of Wales (later King Charles III), Princess Margaret, and the Duke and Duchess of Kent. She is godmother to Lady Gabriella Kingston, daughter of Prince & Princess Michael of Kent. When her husband succeeded his father as the 9th Duke of Wellington, she became the Princess of Waterloo in Belgium and the Netherlands, the Duchess of Victoria in Portugal, the Duchess of Wellington in the United Kingdom, and the Duchess of Ciudad Rodrigo in Spain. They have five children, including Lady Mary Wellesley and Lady Charlotte Wellesley.
