= Lady Mary Wellesley =

British historian and writer

- Born: Mary Luise Wellesley; 16 December 1986 (age 39)
- Education: Lincoln College, Oxford; University College, London
- Occupation: Historian
- Parent(s): Charles Wellesley, 9th Duke of Wellington; Princess Antonia of Prussia

Lady Mary Luise Wellesley (born 16 December 1986) is a British writer and historian specialising in Medieval studies. She is the author of Hidden Hands: The Lives of Manuscripts and Their Makers (2021), published in the U.S. as The Gilded Page: The Secret Lives of Medieval Manuscripts.

== Early life, family, and education ==
Lady Mary Wellesley was born in 1986 to Charles Wellesley, Marquess of Douro and Princess Antonia of Prussia. Her godmother was Diana, Princess of Wales. She studied English language and literature at Lincoln College, Oxford and obtained a doctorate from University College, London in 2017.

== Career ==
Wellesley is an associate fellow at the University of London's Institute of Historical Research and an associate member of the English faculty at Oxford University.

As a medievalist, she has studied and written about England during the 15th century. Wellesley has also written about Francis of Assisi and people of the Victorian period, including Thomas Hardy.

In 2021, Wellesley authored Hidden Hands: The Lives of Manuscripts and Their Makers, published in the U.S. as The Gilded Page: The Secret Lives of Medieval Manuscripts.
