= Cité de l'Architecture et du Patrimoine =

Museum in Paris, France

Coordinates: 48.8627°N 2.2885°E

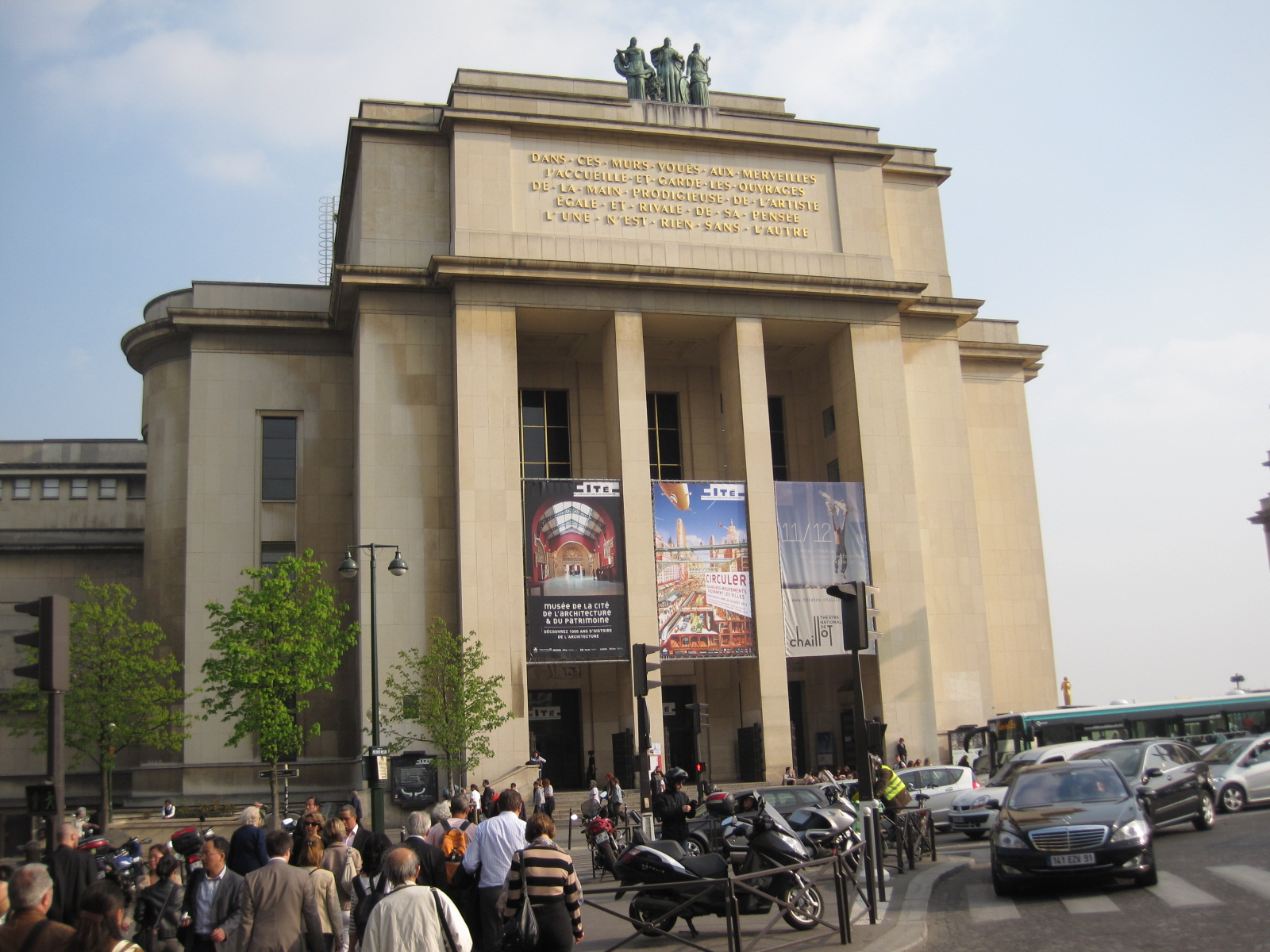
Entrance to the Cité de l'Architecture et du Patrimoine

The Cité de l'architecture et du patrimoine (French pronunciation: [site də laʁʃitɛktyʁ e dy patʁimwan], Architecture and Heritage City) is a cultural institution of architecture, and monumental sculpture located in the Palais de Chaillot (Trocadéro), in Paris, France. Its permanent collection is also known as Musée national des monuments français (National Museum of French Monuments). It was established in 1879 by Eugène Viollet-le-Duc. The museum was renovated in 2007 and covers 9,000 square meters of gallery space. As a whole, the Cité de l'architecture et du patrimoine spreads across 22,000 square meters, which makes it the largest museum devoted to architecture in the world, even surpassing the Design Museum of London.

Alongside temporary exhibitions, it is made of three permanent exhibits :

- Galerie des moulages: casts of monumental French architecture from the 12th to the 18th centuries, such as portals of cathedrals.
- Galerie des peintures murales et des vitraux: copies of murals and stained glasses from French Romanesque and Gothic churches.
- Galerie moderne et contemporaine: models of French and international architecture from 1850 to the present day.

The Cité also houses:

- the Institut français d'architecture (French Institute of Architecture), for the promotion of French architecture and contemporary architects.
- the École de Chaillot (School of Chaillot) founded in 1887 for the training of architects specialising in the restoration of historical monuments.
- a library of architecture

The Cité supported the Global Award for Sustainable Architecture launch in 2006 by the architect and professor Jana Revedin. Placed under the patronage of the UNESCO from 2010, the prize is awarded to 5 architects every year since 2007, at the Cité.

== Gallery ==
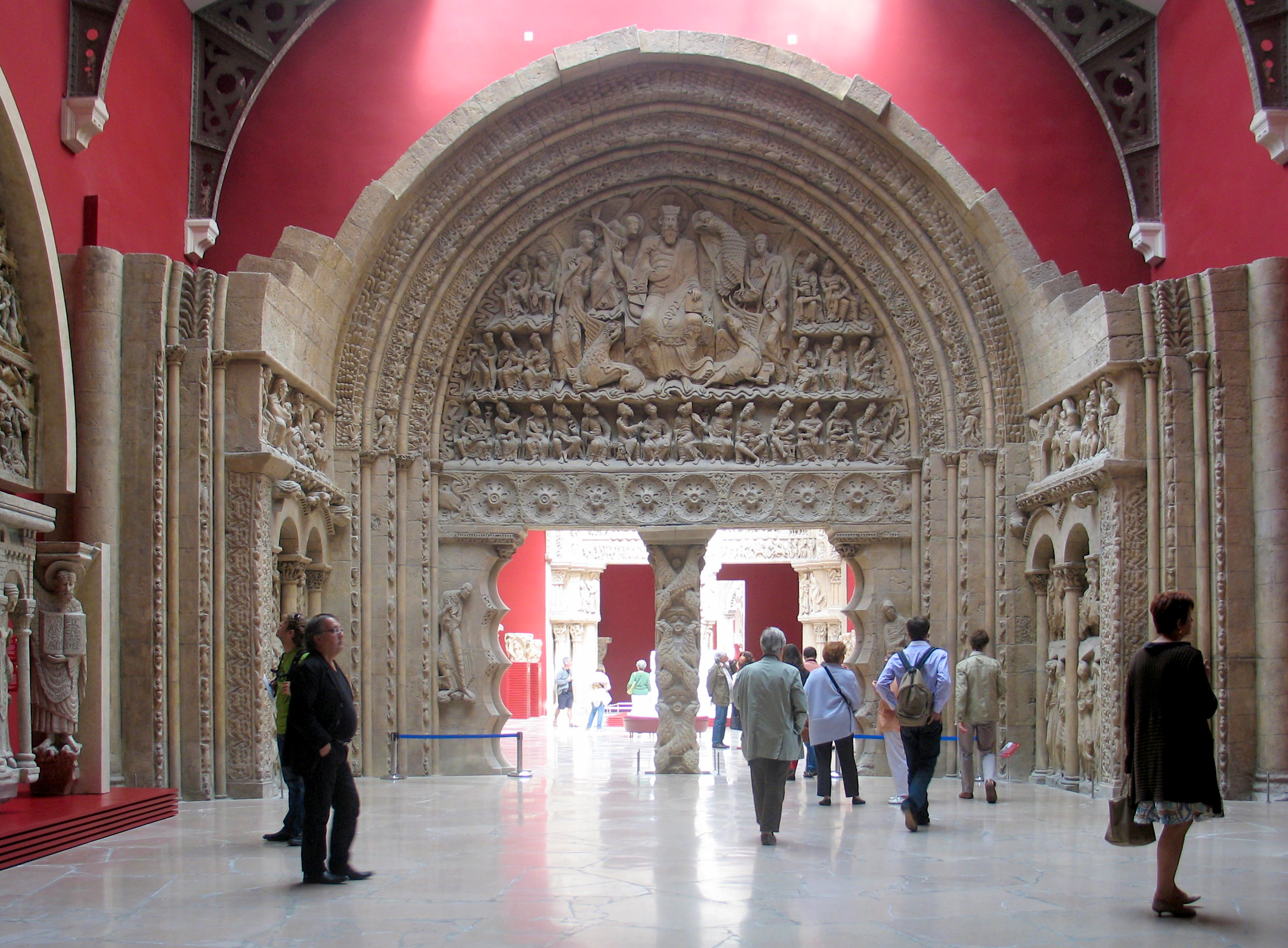
Gallery of French monuments

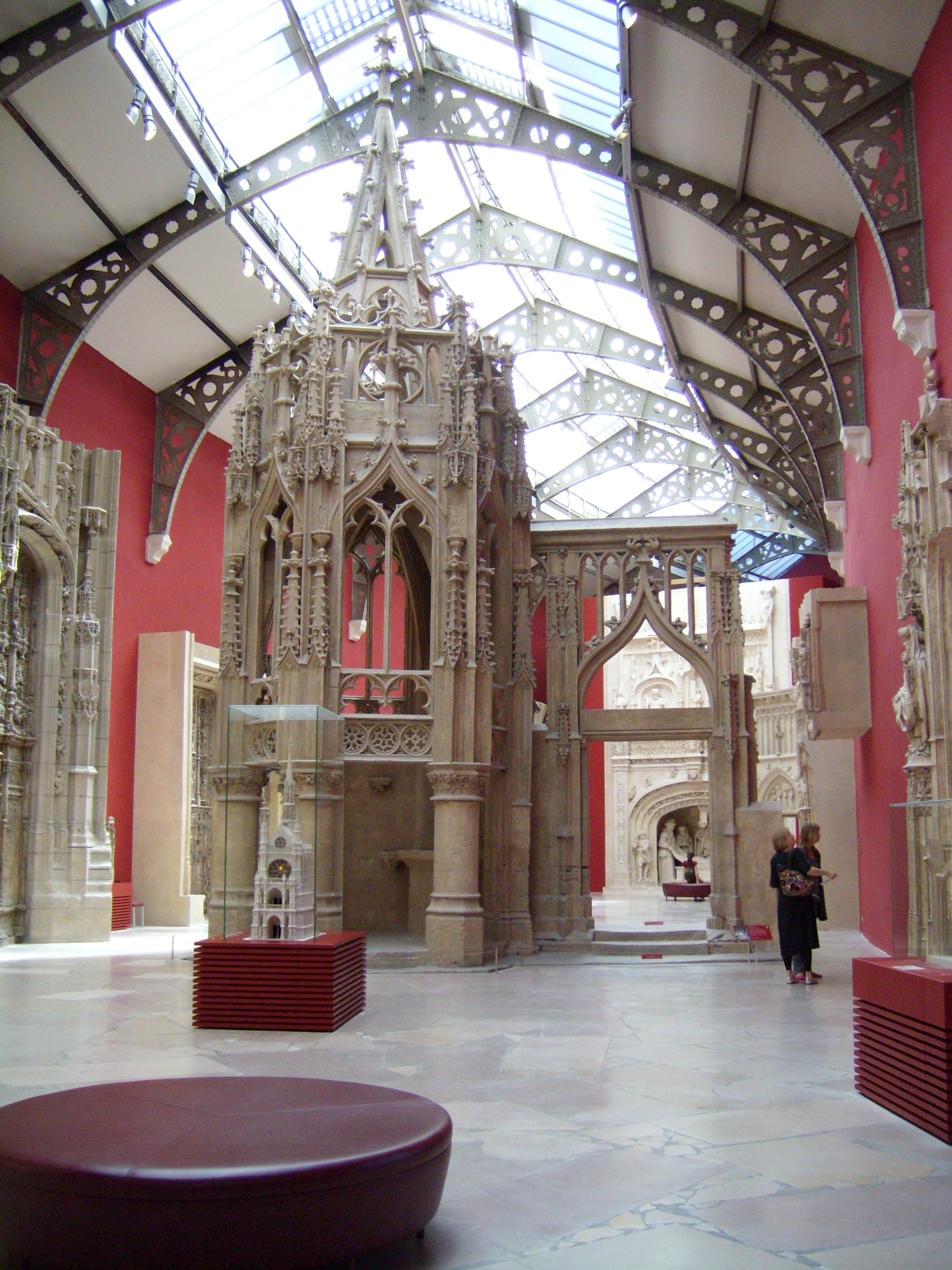
Gallery of French monuments

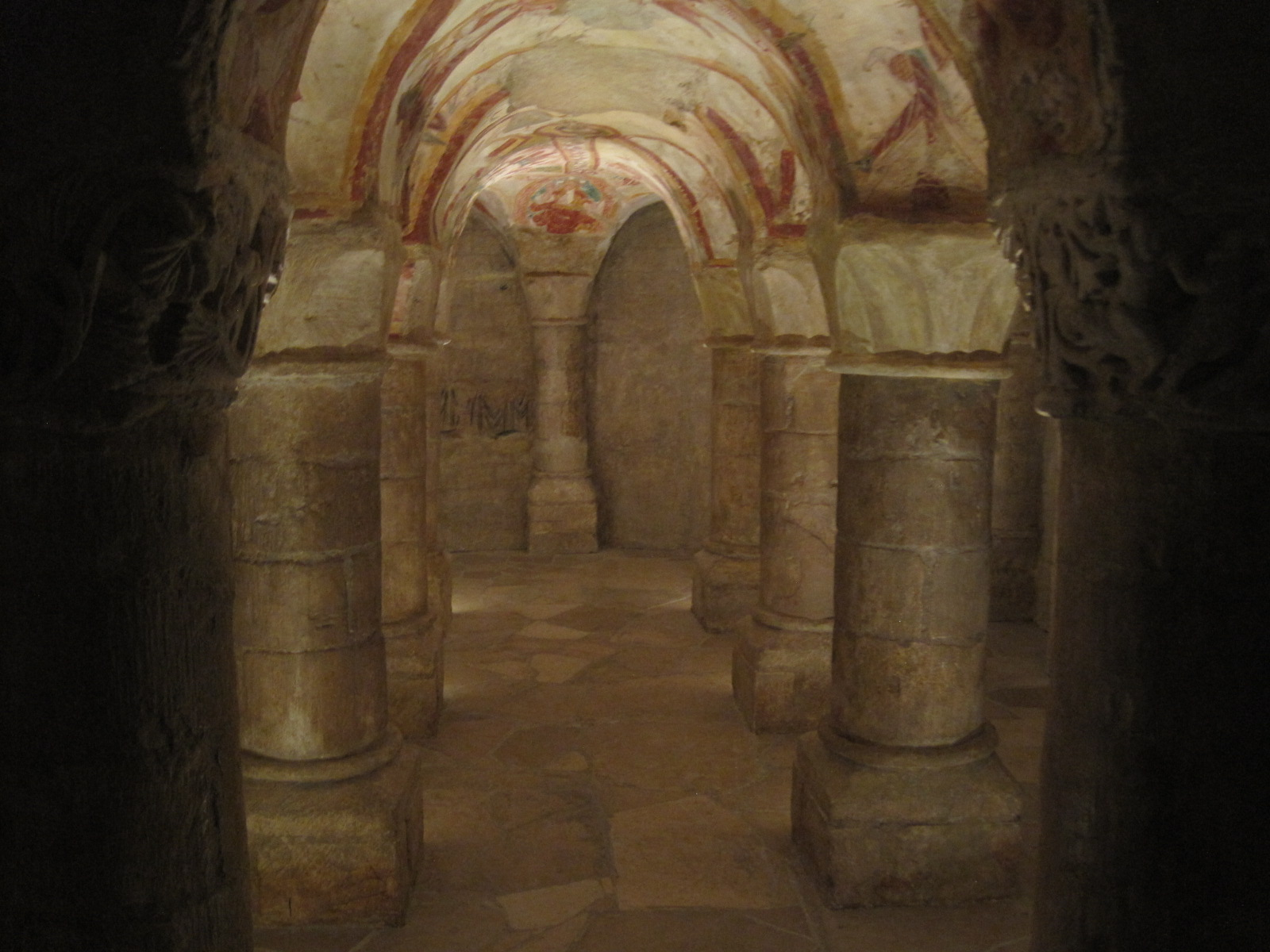
Gallery of murals

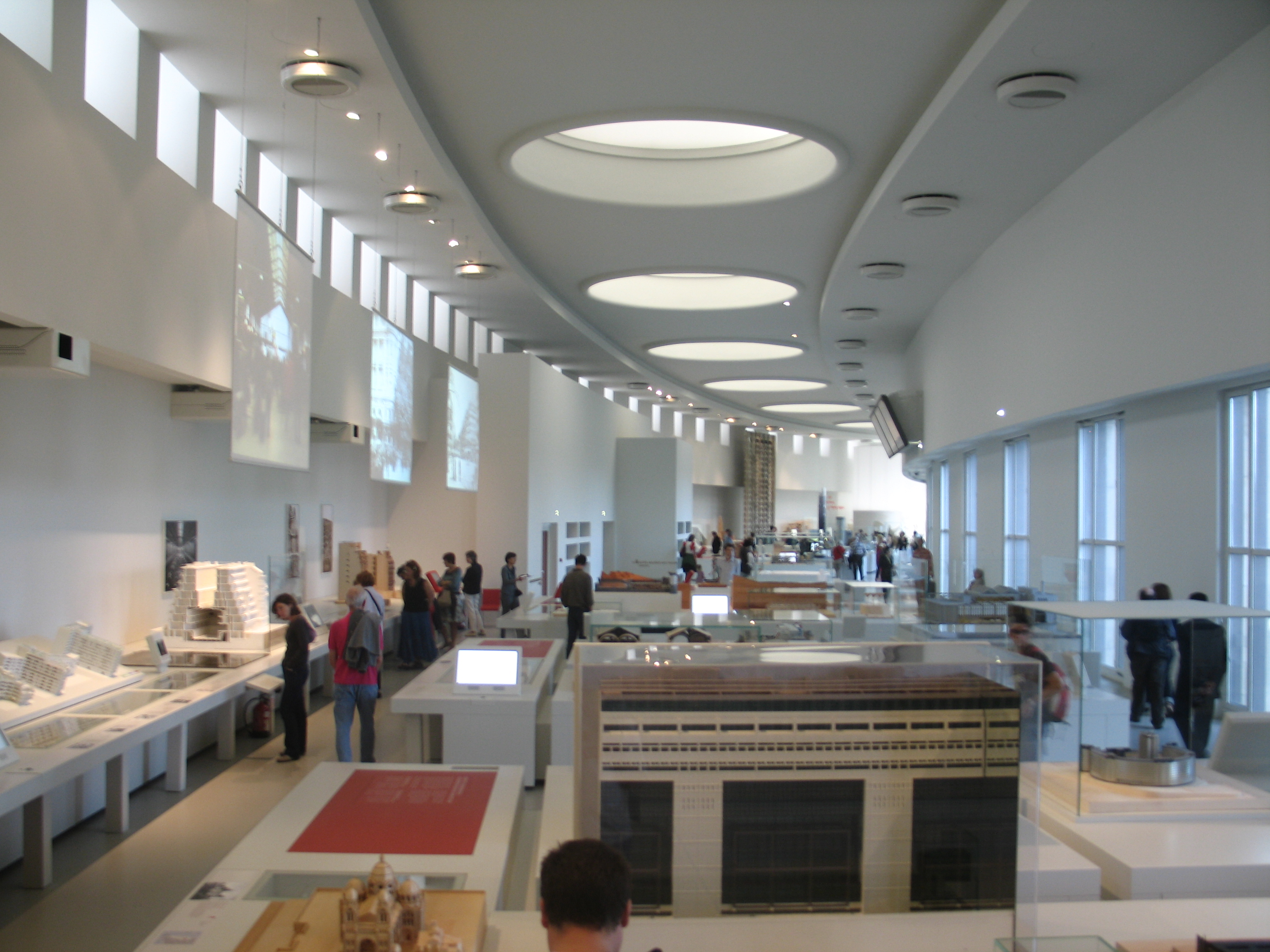
Gallery of modern and contemporary architecture

== See also ==
- List of museums in Paris
- List of largest art museums
- Architecture museums
