= Ecoweek =

Greek brandname

ECOWEEK
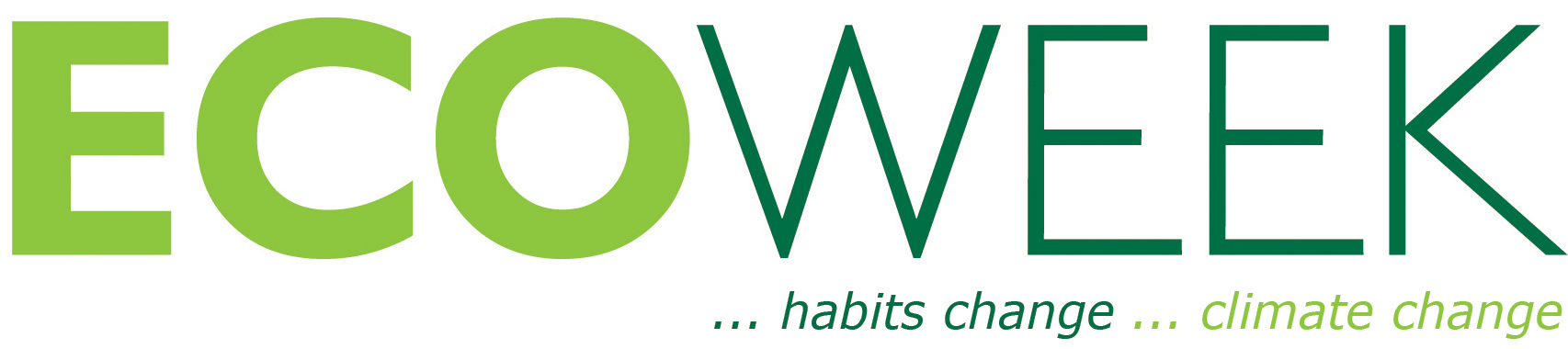
- Founded: Established 2005.
- Type: Environment and Sustainability.
- Purpose: Environmental awareness, Sustainable design, Green Buildings, Sustainability, Placemaking, Urban Intervention.
- Location(s): Aegina, Greece (Based also in Athens, Jerusalem, and Thessaloniki).
- Region served: Europe, Middle East and International.
- Method: Design Workshops, hands-on, placemaking, design build, education, training, cooperation, empowerment.
- Members: In 56 countries
- ECOWEEK over the years has developed programs in Cyprus, Denmark, Germany, Greece, India, Italy, Israel, Netherlands, Poland, Romania, Serbia, Turkey, United Kingdom and West Bank.

ECOWEEK (Greek: Εβδομάδα Οικολογίας) is a private, non-profit organization focused on environmental awareness, climate change, and sustainability.

The organization hosts workshops, conferences, and training programs for young professionals and students in fields such as architecture, design, engineering, and landscape architecture. These programs collaborate with local authorities and academic institutions on public design and placemaking projects.

== History ==
ECOWEEK was first established in Aegina, Greece in 2005, as a community event – Ecological Week in Aegina – to raise environmental awareness of the local community of 14,000. At the time Aegina was challenged by unresolved waste management, illegal burning of waste, inexistent waste recycling program, water shortages, energy shortages, and a partially unregulated, speculative construction market for summer houses. These factors put pressure on protected areas to be developed and constructed. Summer home construction also contributed to the illegal disposal of construction waste in natural preserves and increased pressure on the capacity of the existing infrastructure of the island.

In 2007, responding to an increase demand for environmental awareness beyond Aegina, ECOWEEK co-organized activity throughout Greece, and initiated free-admission screenings of award-winning documentary on climate change by Davis Guggenheim, An Inconvenient Truth with Al Gore, in schools, army bases, and public fora in Athens, Thessaloniki, Patras, Lamia, Corfu, and Crete. Within this activity, in June 2007, ECOWEEK held a public free-admission keynote lecture and slide show on climate change with Al Gore at the Athens Concert Hall. In 2007 ECOWEEK was also established in Jerusalem, Israel and in 2008 ECOWEEK initiated the first Ecological Week in Larnaca, Cyprus, in cooperation with the Municipality of Larnaka, involving schools, universities, professional organizations, and the general public.

== Programs ==
Since 2005, the organization's activities have included beach cleanups, distribution of environmental equipment, lectures, site visits, design workshops, and documentary screenings.

Since 2008, its activities have shifted toward sustainable design, ecological building, and placemaking, primarily through week-long workshops and conferences. The organization has partnered with entities such as the American Institute of Architects Continental Europe, the British Council, and the Goethe-Institut. ECOWEEK has initiated and organized activities in Ag. Nikolaos (Crete), Athens, Azaryia (Bethany), Belgrade, Bucharest, Cairns, Copenhagen, Istanbul, Jerusalem, Kraków, London, Milano, Mumbai, Sarajevo, Tel Aviv, Thessaloniki, Tilburg, Prishtina, and Rome.

In 2017, the organization published ECOWEEK Book#1: 50 Voices for Sustainability, a collection of fifty articles by architects, academics, and environmentalists, including Kengo Kuma, Bjarke Ingels, MVRDV, Françoise-Hélène Jourda, Diébédo Francis Kéré, Michael Sorkin, David Orr, and Robert Swan. The same year ECOWEEK also issued ECOWEEK: The Workshops a publication with a collection of ideas and projects from the ECOWEEK workshops (2009-2016).

In 2021, it published ECOWEEK Book#2: 15 Paths to Sustainability: from Innovation to Social Design, which features articles on sustainable design, circular economies, and public participation. The same year ECOWEEK also issued ECOWEEK Workshops (2009-2021) a publication with a collection of ideas and projects from the ECOWEEK workshops in 17 countries.

== Hassan Fathy ==
In 1989 ECOWEEK co-founder architect Elias Messinas met the late Egyptian architect Hassan Fathy – author of Architecture for the Poor – in Cairo. In that meeting, Fathy conveyed to Elias how problems in Egypt – among them is housing for the poor – could be solved. Among others Fathy challenged Messinas when he emphasized the need for young professionals to be more aware of their own community; and instead of imitating architecture in international magazines, to reach out, learn about and be creative while benefiting with their work their own community.

Inspired by Fathy, ECOWEEK workshops have gradually developed a more hands-on approach that links between academia and the community, and between professionals and students since 2010. Aiming to both empower and train young professionals to address urban public space, placemaking, urban communities through interventions in design and hands-on workshops in urban public context, ECOWEEK and its partners have developed a model of close collaboration with local authorities, local organizations and leaders. Through this collaboration, the ECOWEEK workshops are assigned projects that are real, support them with professional consultants and see that some of the projects are implemented. Students' ideas are heard and cities, neighborhoods and communities benefit from the innovative and creative ideas of students and the professional guidance of the workshop leaders. The ECOWEEK workshops have developed sustainable proposals for Copenhagen, Thessaloniki, Rome, Belgrade, Kraków, Jerusalem, and Azaryia, and placamaking interventions at the Neot Shoshanim community center in Holon.

== The GREENHOUSE ==
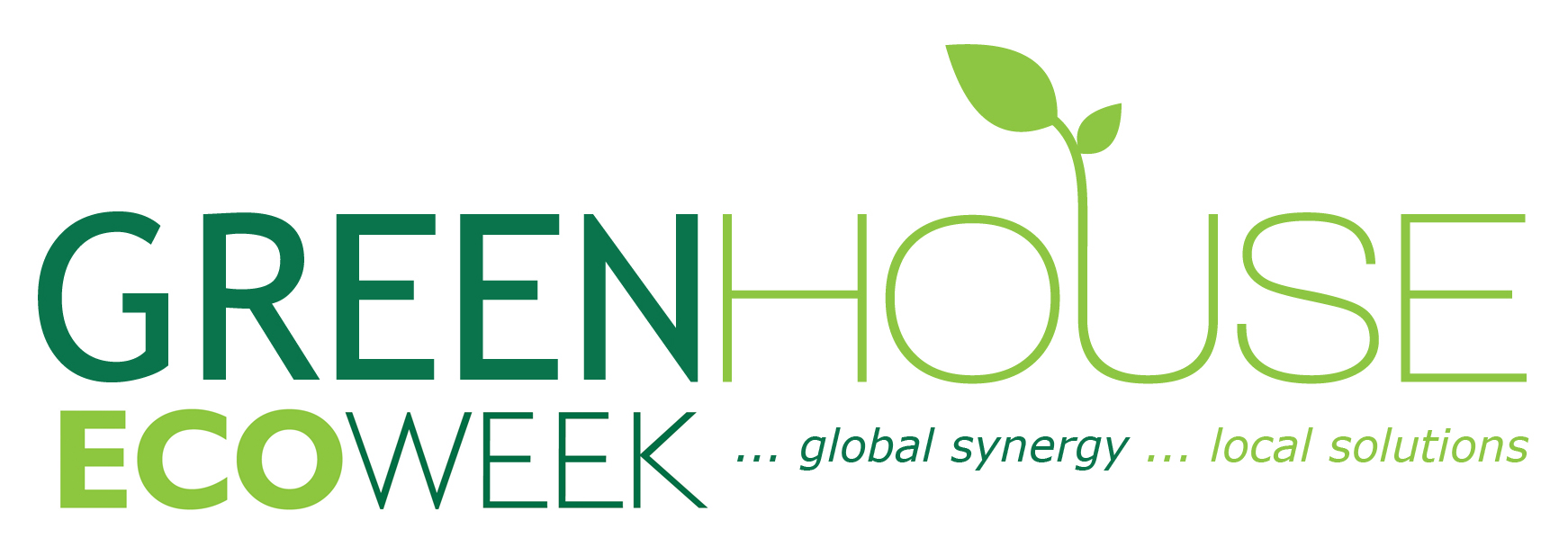

In 2011, the organization established the GREENHOUSE in Athens, Greece, as a year-round program. The platform coordinates students and young designers to work on projects for non-profit organizations and local municipalities. The GREENHOUSE teams, under the guidance of experienced professionals, have developed sustainable solutions for schools, community centers, welfare institutions and the urban public space in Athens and Thessaloniki in Greece and Holon, Bat Yam and Jaffa in Israel.

== Online Challenge ==
During the COVID-19 pandemic, the organization transitioned its programs online to host virtual design events for students and professionals. The first such event took place in May 2020 attracting more than 350 participants from 20 countries. The second took place in October 2020. More online events took place in Rome and Greece in 2021.
