= Teresa Moller =

Chilean landscape architect (born 1958)

- Born: Santiago
- Education: New York Botanical Garden
- Occupation: landscape architect
- Notable work: Punta Pite
- Awards: 2021 Global Award for Sustainable Architecture

Teresa Moller (born in Santiago, 1958) is a Chilean landscape architect.

== Biography ==
Born in Santiago, Chile, Moller studied at the New York Botanical Garden, where she learned the basic skills of hand drafting and designing skills before opening her landscape design studio.

She has developed projects such as Punta Pite and the Periurban Calama Park in Chile, alongs with works in Shanghai, Argentina, Corsica, and a permanent exhibition for Internationale Gartenausstellung 2017 titled Being under the trees.

In 2011, Punta Pite was included in Blanca Montaña (White Mountain), a selection of the most outstanding works of Chilean architecture over the past 20 years, alongside projects by Alejandro Aravena, Smiljan Radic, and Pezo von Ellrichshausen. Five years later, she was invited to design an intervention for the International Exhibition of the Venice Architecture Biennale, where she displayed a series of travertine marble pieces extracted from a quarry in the Atacama Desert.

Moller received the 2021 Global Award for Sustainable Architecture, sponsored by UNESCO, alongside Paraguayan architects Gloria Cabral, José Cubilla, and Solano Benítez. She was also featured as one of the 50 landscape architects in 250 Things a Landscape Architect Should Know, published by Birkhauser publishers that same year.

In 2024, Moller served on the jury for the $60 million revitalization of the National Gallery of Australia's three-hectare sculpture garden, alongside Philip Goad, Nici Cumpston, and Nick Mitzevich.

Her approach to work has been described as "a careful observation and awareness of the landscape is key for developing successful social-culture projects."

== Publications ==
- Unveiling the Landscape (2014)
