= TYIN tegnestue Architects =

Architecture firm

- TYIN Tegnestue Architects at one of their workshops

Practise Information
- Company Type: Architectural Design
- Founded: 2010
- Headquarters: Trondheim, Norway
- Website: http://www.tyintegnestue.no/

TYIN tegnestue Architects is an architecture firm that centers on a philosophy of an architecture of necessity. It has mainly completed work in the humanitarian field abroad, but the core thinking lies in the adaption of situations.

TYIN's key aspect of an "architecture of necessity" is about decisions that have real consequences for real people now, but also in the future and the involvement with the local people in a project ensures that there is a connection with culture, philosophy and vision of the people.

== Soe Ker Tie House ==
TYIN travelled to a small village on the Thai-Burmese border in Thailand in 2008, following a meeting with Ola Jorgen Edna to design a project in Noh Bo. Edna, who was originally from Levanger Norway and currently resides in Thailand, opened an orphanage in Noh Bo in 2006 for Karen refugee children. The orphanage housed around 24 children but needed to expand to accommodate around 50 children. The intention was to facilitate each and every child with their own private space.

The architects involved were Andreas Grontvedt Gjertsen, Yashar Hanstad, Magnus Henricksen, Line Ramstad, Erlend Bauck Sole and Pasi Aalto. The project began in November 2008 and was completed in February 2009, costing $12, 300 (63,000 NOK) in total. The Soe Ker Tie House comprises six sleeping units, and the Soe Ker Tie House was dubbed by the workers as "The Butterfly Houses".

In Noh Bo the Soe Ker Tie Houses are unique and the designs have never been seen before. The specially shaped roofs facilitate natural ventilation and rain water collection. The Butterfly Houses are assembled using a mixture of natural and man-made materials. This consists of bamboo, concrete, 'iron' wood and old tyres. All the money spent on the project was used within surrounding villages in Noh Bo, strengthening the local economy. The combination of traditional and new materials facilitated the mutual exchange of knowledge between TYIN and the Karen workers.

A number of the new principles were introduced by TYIN during the construction of the Soe Ker Tie Houses, like the bracing of timber structures, and the casting of concrete in reused car tires. All these reduced the need for large amounts of expensive materials and time-consuming maintenance. This could not have been achieved by the Karen workers alone, because of the lack of educational and vocational training facilities. For this reason these techniques were designed to be copied and adapted by the Karen workers for any future development.

For the children of Noh Bo, the butterfly Houses are now their home which would normally consist of poor and cramped rooms.

== Safe Haven Bathhouse ==
After the six months working with Ola Jorgen Edna in Noh Bo, TYIN contacted Tasanee Keereepraneed of the Safe Haven Orphanage. The orphanage was further north in Ban Tha Song Yang and was home to 49 children. These children were fed, sheltered and provided with an education. The existing sanitary facilities at the Safe Haven Orphanage were dark, narrow and accumulated dirt. The new bathhouse proposed to facilitate the basic needs of toilets, personal hygiene and laundry.

The architects involved with the design of the Safe Haven Bathhouse were, Andreas Grontvedt Gjertsen and Yashar Hanstad. The project began on 12 January and was completed two weeks later on 29 January 2009. The total cost of the build was $3,800, as a simple structure was already built on site and became the framework for the new building.

The toilets are located out of view behind concrete walls at each end. The central area is open for bathing. For Karen culture the bathing area is partly privatized, this is achieved by the slanting bamboo facade, obstructing the view into the building. The facade also creates a covered passageway linking the two functions together.

Within this bathhouse TYIN attempted alternative solutions, such as layers of stone and gravel below the wooden flooring, allow all the wet rooms to remain clean and dry. The drainage had to be designed cope with the additional amount of water during the rainy season.

== Safe Haven Library ==
An additional facility was crucial at the orphanage, a library. Safe Haven Library was the result of a two-week-long workshop with 15 students from the Norwegian University of Science and Technology under the watchful eye of TYIN and the NTNU professors. This was led by Sami Rintala

The 15 students involved were Jan Kristian Borgen, Mari Folven, Ragnhild Forde, Sunniva Vold Huus, Olav Fasetbru Kildal, Lene M. N. Kveernss, Oda Moen Most, Ojan Nyheim, Karoline Salomonsen, Anne Sandnes, Ola Sendsted, Kristoffer B. Thorud, Caroline Tjernas, Pasi Aalto and Anders Sellevold Asseth. The library began on 12 January 2009 and was completed by 29 January, costing a total of $4,900.

Starting from the ground up, large rocks and stones were collected from the neighbouring area, to form a basic foundation base for the concrete to be cast. The solid walls are made up of concrete blocks, which provide the mass to keep the building cool during the day. While the bamboo facades provide natural source of ventilation, the ironwood makes up the internal load bearing framework.

A few themes stand out: simple, modern construction with local materials, the creation of small, private nooks for personal space, and many children. The library received ArchDaily's 2009 Building of the Year award for the Library/Museum category.

== Old Market Building ==
Within this project TYIN formed partnership with another firm, CASE who had already been working in the area of Min Buri, Bangkok for a few years. The focus was directed towards a more urban situation after the projects in the northern Thailand.

The architects involved were Kasama Yamtree, Andreas Grontvedt Gjertsen, Yashar Hanstad, Magnus Henricksen, Erlend Sole and Pasi Aalto. The project began in March 2009 and was completed in May 2009 costing $4,500 in total.

The Old Market Library is built within a 100-year-old building, which is reflected in the poor condition of the roof and walls. The library is contained within a space only measuring 3 by 9 meters and a small courtyard facing a canal.

The library is built using recycled and locally sourced products. The bookshelves were even reused from a CASE'S previous project. The cladding inside was collected from the surrounding area, only high quality wood was bought from a nearby markets.

The working methods have been changing throughout all the projects. While the Safe Haven Library was both designed and built in a period of 15 days, the Soe Ker Tie project and this community library are both results of several months of studies and collaborative design. Through the use of the local and cheap materials, TYIN has showcased what the community can achieve themselves, using their own resources.

== Workshops ==
UdK

UdK Workshop Image of final structure

As an exercise before the 2011-project in Bangkok, the team from Universität der Künste in Berlin and TYIN tegnestue Architects organized a workshop in Berlin in December 2010. They worked with materials found in Berlin and the principle was to test these salvaged components and ideas to produce a full-scale model.

Villa Noailles

In the months of February and March 2010, Rudy Ricciotti, Patrick Bouchain Lacaton & Vassal, Luca Merlini and Lefevre & Aubert wanted to further investigate the world of architecture and through this he gathered two teams of architects - TYIN and Anna Heringer to exhibit their work.

WOMAD

Ribbon Stage at WOMAD

A project simply titled "4 teams, 4 days, 4 stages for 4 performances", was a collaboration with 'Fourth Door Review' and 'Tangentfield'. With the involvement of those who are experienced in the field of architecture and humanitarian and aid sector. TYIN with a group of volunteers and assistants worked hard together over 4 days to produce their vision of a stage that was titled the 'Ribbon Stage'. Their design was quoted as being revolutionary and was further exhibited at other festivals such as 'Beautiful Days'.

== Awards ==
- 2009 ArchDaily Building of the Year, Museums and Libraries Winner International (prosjekt: «Safe Haven Library»)
- 2010 Best of TIDA, Eco and Conservation Award Winner Thailand
- 2010 International Sustainability Award, Sustainable Building Second Italy
- 2010 Making Space Awards Winner Scotland
- 2010 The Earth Awards, Social Justice Award Winner UK
- 2010 WA Awards 10th Cycle Winner International
- 2011 Architecture of Necessity Honorable Mention Sweden
- 2011 Dedale Minosse Award Winner Italy
- 2011 Great Places Award Finalist UK
- 2011 The International Architecture Awards Winner International
- 2011 WA Awards 11th Cycle Winner International
- 2012 AR+d Emerging Architecture Awards High Commendation International
- 2012 Archdaily Building of the Year, Educational Winner International
- 2012 Civic Trust Awards Shortlisted UK
- 2012 Curry Stone Design Prize Nominated US
- 2012 European Prize for Architecture Winner International
- 2012 Global Award for Sustainable Architecture
- 2012 Hise Award for Innovative and Sustainable Houses Nominated Slovenia
- 2012 Iakov Chernikhov International Prize Nominated Russia
- 2012 Mies van der Rohe Award Nominated International
- 2012 Norsk Form Pris for Unge Arkitekter Winner Norway
- 2012 Premio Ventanas al Futuro de la Arquitectura Winner Argentina
- 2012 TED City 2.0 Winner International
- 2013 Aga Khan Award Nominated International
- 2013 Green Planet Award Award Member International
- 2013 Innovation by Design Awards, Spaces category Winner International
- 2014 Swiss Architecture Award Nominated Switzerland
- 2014 Vassilis Sgoutas Prize Nominated International
- 2014 Brick Awards Nominated International
- 2014 Design for Experience Award Nominated International
