= Teddy Cruz =

Guatemala-born American architect

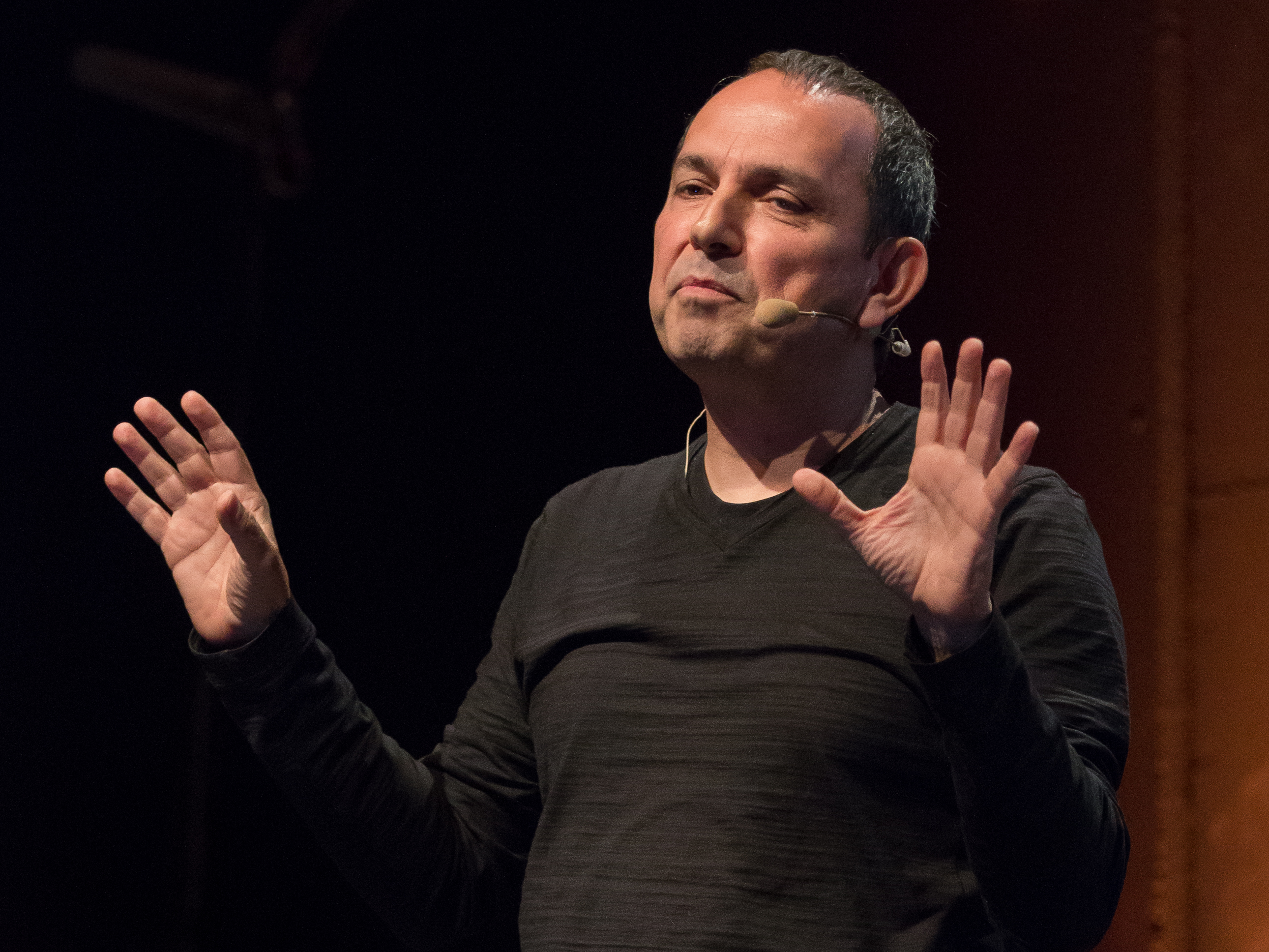
- Teddy Cruz at the See-Conference 2015
- Born: 1962 (age 63–64); Guatemala City, Guatemala
- Education: Rafael Landivar University, BA, 1982; California State Polytechnic University, San Luis Obispo, B.Arch, 1987; Harvard Graduate School of Design, M.Des.S, 1997
- Occupation: Architect
- Awards: Rome Prize in Architecture(1991); Global Award for Sustainable Architecture (2011)
- Practice: Estudio Teddy Cruz + Fonna Forman
- Design: Construction durable

Teddy Cruz (born 1962 in Guatemala City, Guatemala) is an American architect, urbanist, Professor in Architecture and Urbanism in the Visual Arts Department at the University of California, San Diego. Cruz studied at Rafael Landivar University in Guatemala City, Guatemala, but moved to the United States at the age of 20, continuing his education at California State Polytechnic University, San Luis Obispo, and the Harvard Graduate School of Design in Cambridge, Massachusetts.

Cruz is the founder and president of Estudio Teddy Cruz + Fonna Forman, a research-based political and architectural practice based in San Diego built in partnership with University of California, San Diego political theorist Fonna Forman.

Cruz's architectural and intellectual projects have been exhibited at internationally renowned venues, including: the Tijuana Cultural Center, Museum of Contemporary Art San Diego, Carnegie Museum of Art, Walker Art Center, San Francisco Art Institute, Casa de America in Madrid, Spain, and Small Scale, Big Change: New Architectures of Social Engagement at the Museum of Modern Art. Apart from his design work, Cruz's project at UCSD, Community Stations, champions the mutual exchange of knowledge between universities and communities, the latter of which he feels have their own valuable resources and assets that are often overlooked.
