= Holešovice =

District in Prague, Czech Republic

- Cadastral Area of Prague
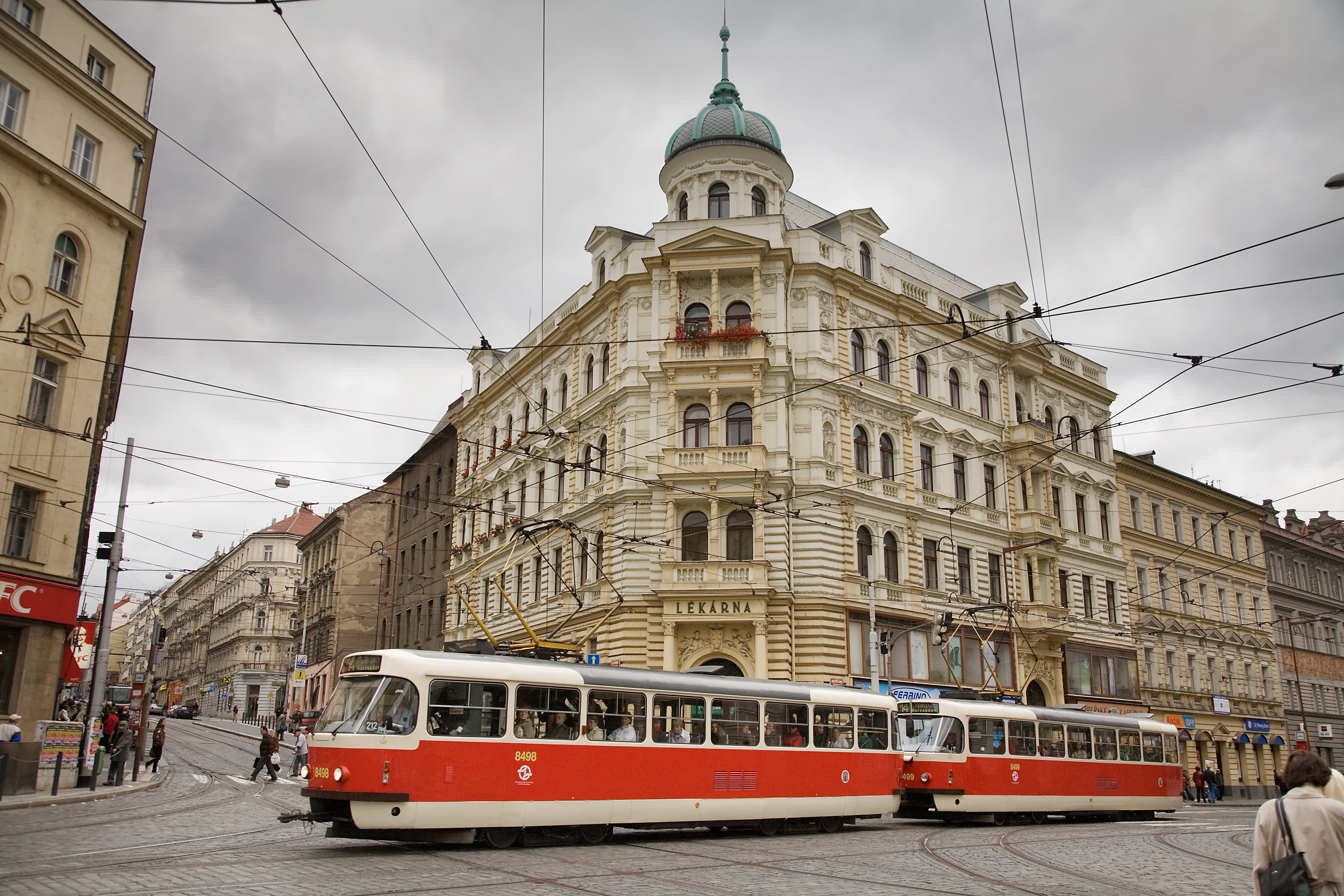
- Prague tram on the Strossmayer Square, one of the main centres of Holešovice

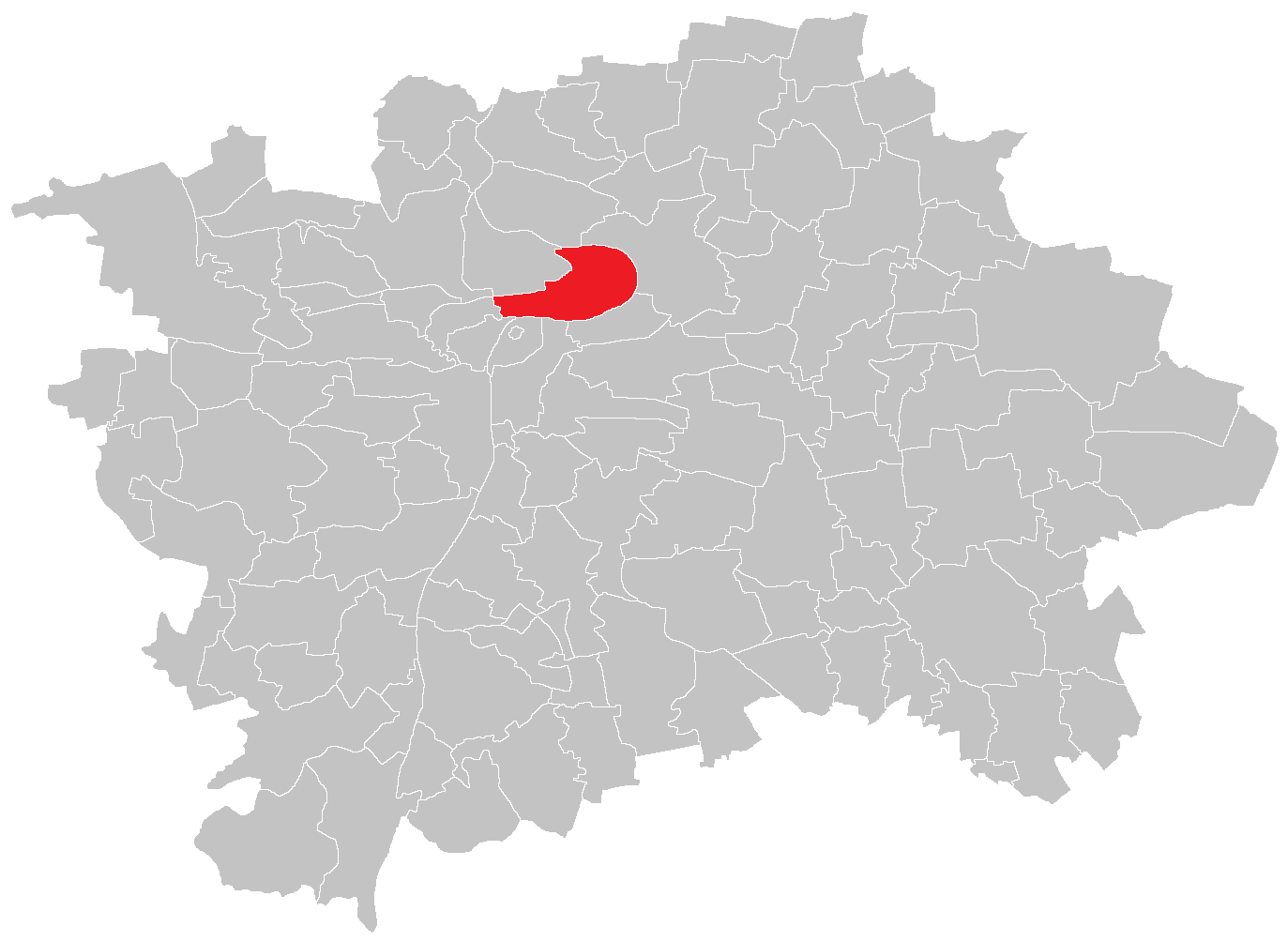
- Location of Holešovice in Prague
- Coordinates: 50°06′10″N 14°26′23″E
- Country: Czech Republic
- Region: Prague
- District: Prague 1, Prague 7

Area
  - Total: 4.69 km^{2} (1.81 sq mi)

Population (2021)
  - Total: 37,664
  - Density: 8,030/km^{2} (20,800/sq mi)
- Time zone: UTC+1 (CET)
  - Summer (DST): UTC+2 (CEST)
- Postal code: 110 00, 150 00

Holešovice (Czech pronunciation: [ˈɦolɛʃovɪtsɛ]) is a district in the north of Prague situated on a meander of the River Vltava, which makes up the main part of the district Prague 7 (an insignificant part belongs to Prague 1). In the past Holešovice was a heavily industrial suburb; today it is home to the main site of the Prague's National Gallery with the Trade Fair Palace (Veletržní palác), and the National Technical Museum.

In 1928, the Libeň Bridge was opened on the site of a wooden temporary bridge from 1903, and is still the longest river bridge in Prague. In 2020, The Guardian named Holešovice as one of the 10 coolest neighborhoods in Europe.

== Etymology ==
The name came from the family name, Holíš, which can mean either 'bald' or 'beardless'.

== Church of St. Anthony of Padua ==
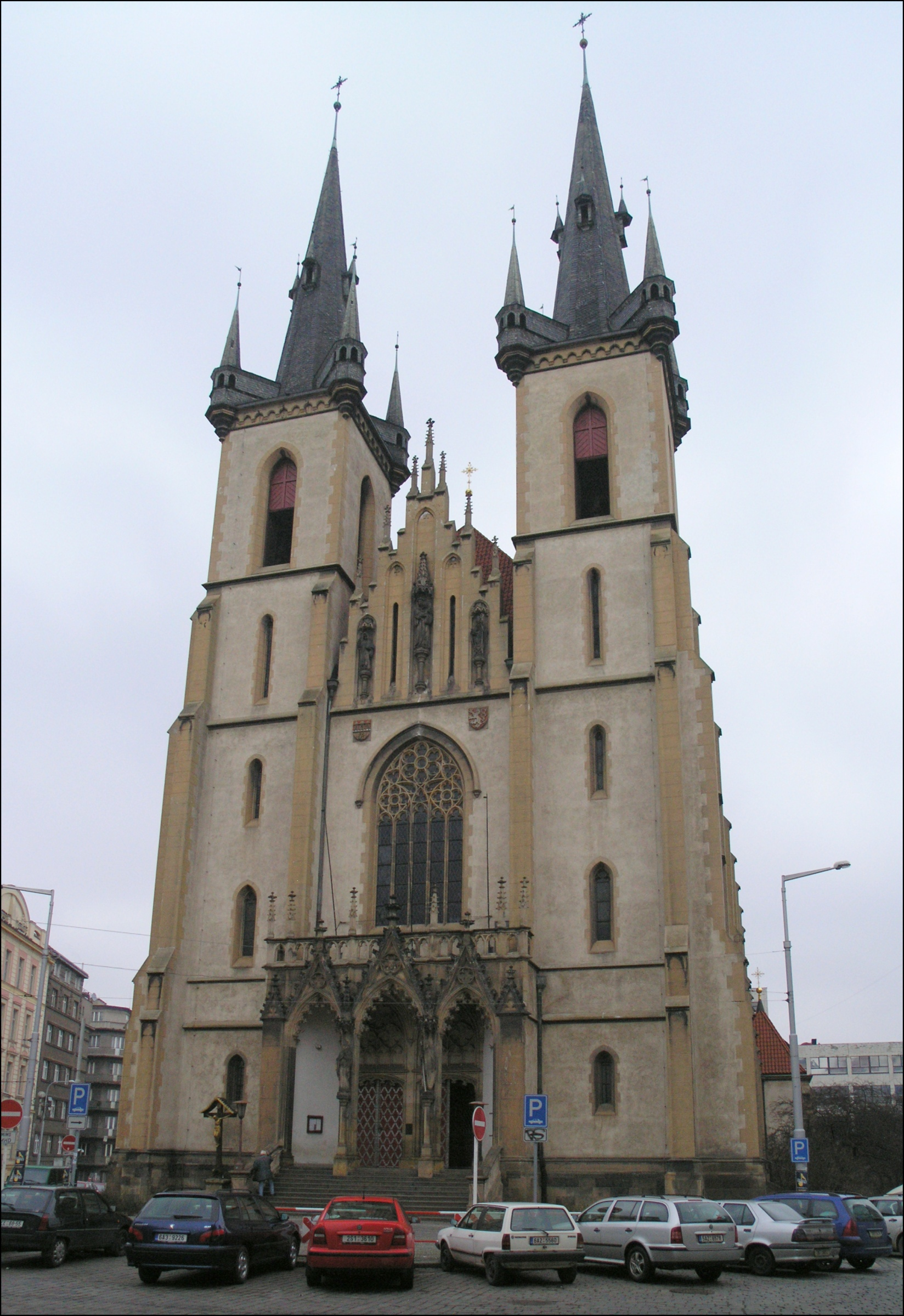
Church of St. Anthony of Padua, Prague

On the Strossmayer Square lies neo-Gothic Church of St. Anthony of Padua. It was built between 1908 and 1911 by the architect František Mikš and built according to the model of the Týn Church on the Old Town Square. It has been protected as a permanent cultural monument since 2015. On October 26, 1916, the church bells were destroyed for war efforts, with only the smallest, weighing forty kilograms and named Rafael, being preserved. After World War I, new bells were provided by Herold's Bell Company in Chomutov. During World War II, most of these bells were taken by Germany. In the 1980s, the church hung a 1918 gift from the American nation to the Czech people, the Liberty Bell, which is the only accurate replica of the original Liberty Bell in Independence Hall, Philadelphia.

== Church of St. Klimenta/Clement ==
The Church of St. Klimenta/Clement on Kostelní Street is the oldest preserved church in the district. The first mentions of the church date from 1234. It is originally Romanesque, and later it received a Gothic reconstruction. The church is a cultural monument of the Czech Republic and has been registered as a permanent cultural monument since 1964.

== DOX Centre for Contemporary Art ==
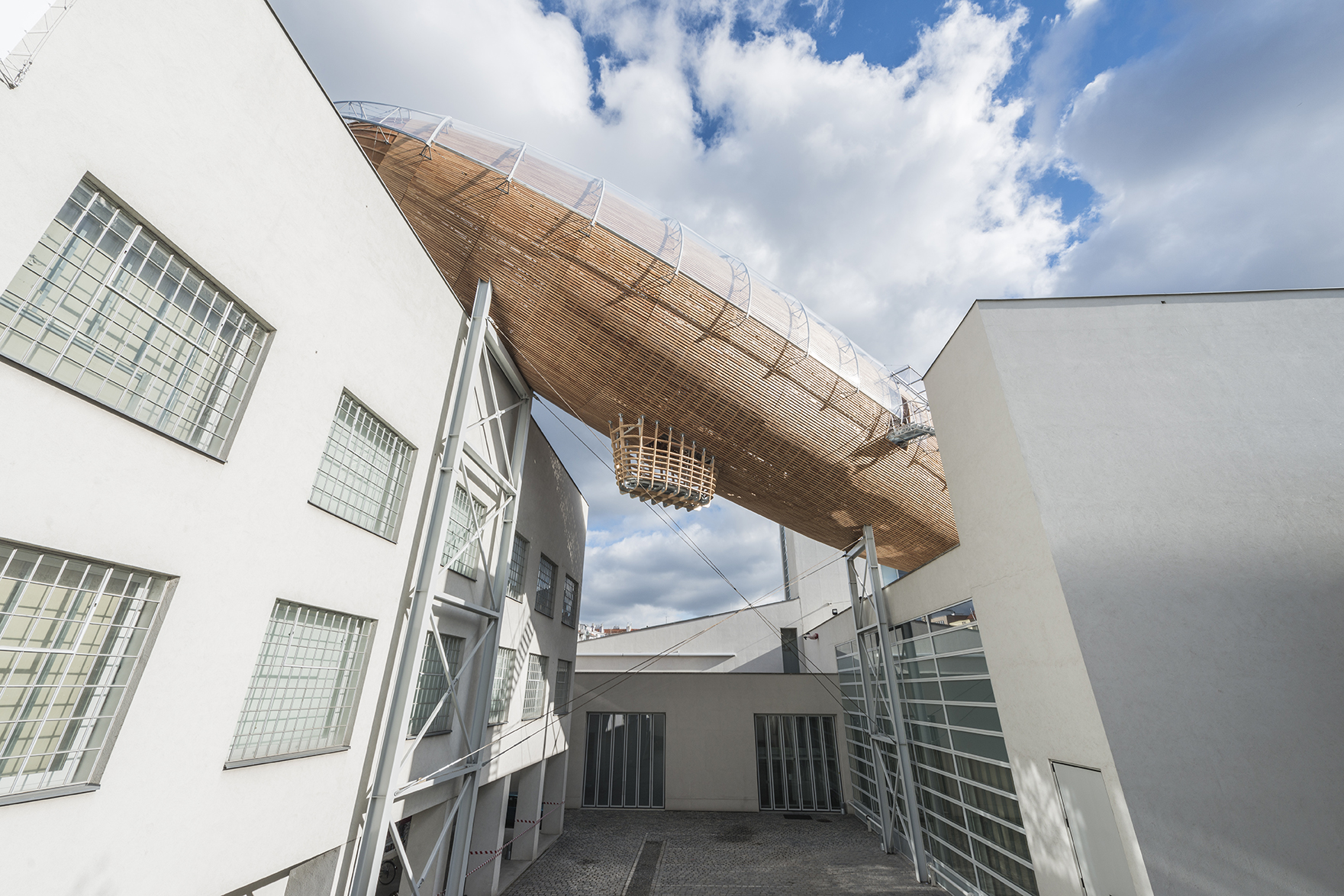
DOX Centre for Contemporary Art

The DOX Centre for Contemporary Art is a multifunctional space focused on the presentation of contemporary art, architecture, and design. It was created by the reconstruction of a former factory and was opened in 2008. The space is the work of architect Ivan Kroupa. In 2008, the DOX Centre for Contemporary Art was nominated for the European Union Prize for Contemporary Architecture It is known for its large rooftop sculpture/event center, Gulliver Airship, created by Martin Rajniš in 2016. The wood and steel body of the airship itself, which visitors can walk through, connects two roof terraces of different heights.

== Demographics ==
Historical population

Year	Pop.	±%
1869	3,094	—
1880	10,852	+250.7%
1890	15,352	+41.5%
1900	30,797	+100.6%
1910	39,704	+28.9%

Year	Pop.	±%
1921	46,335	+16.7%
1930	59,150	+27.7%
1950	61,039	+3.2%
1961	63,809	+4.5%
1970	56,960	−10.7%

Year	Pop.	±%
1980	46,489	−18.4%
1991	38,300	−17.6%
2001	34,143	−10.9%
2011	34,930	+2.3%
2021	37,664	+7.8%

Source: Censuses

== Transport ==
There are two metro stops in Holešovice, both on the C line – Vltavská and Nádraží Holešovice, which is connected with one of the largest railway stations in Prague of the same name. This district is also crossed with many tram and bus stops. This district is considered one of the most bike-friendly districts in the whole city, having many bike lanes a bikeways.
