= Martin Rajniš =

Czech architect, urban planner and professor

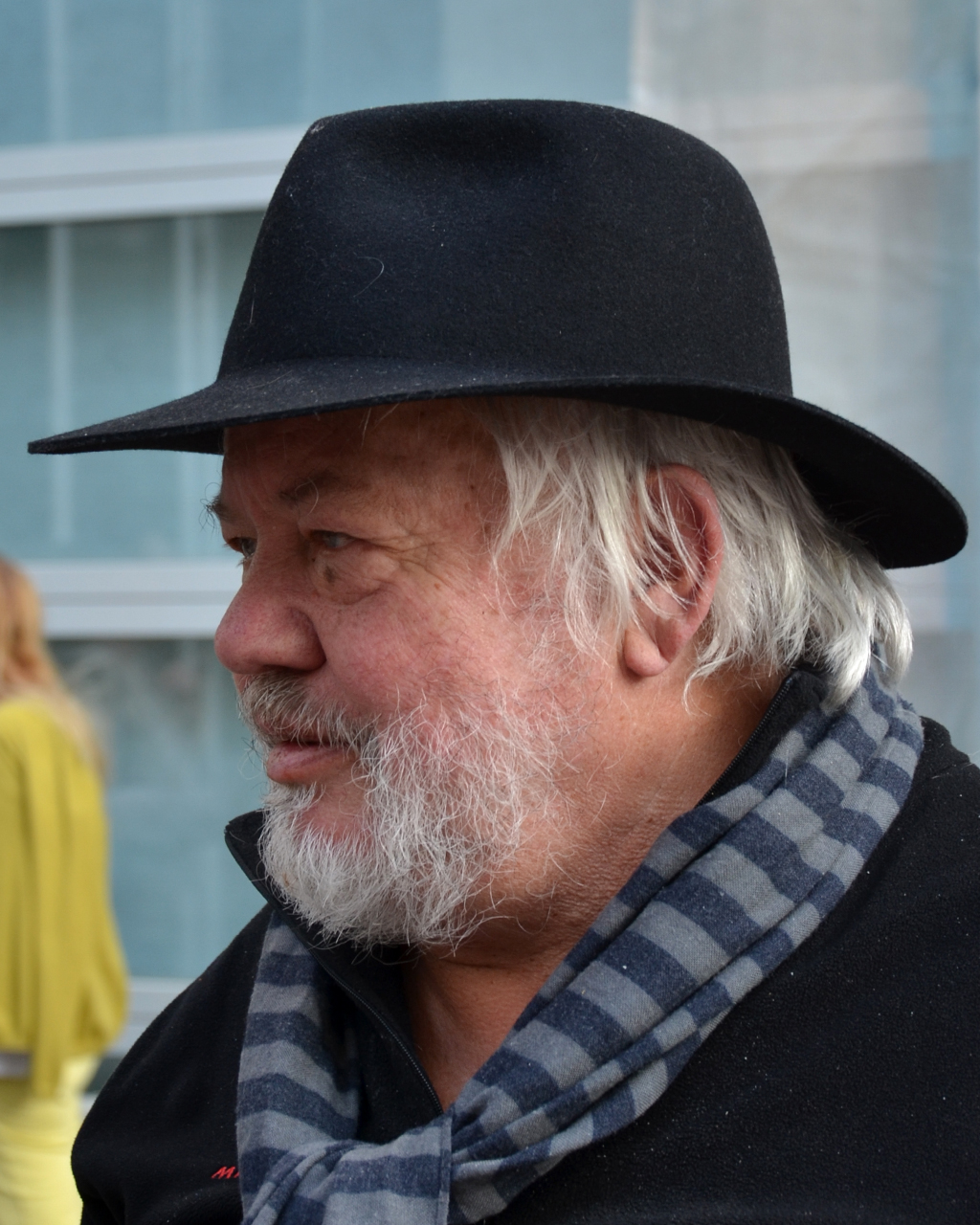
- Martin Rajniš (2016)
- Born: 16 May 1944 (age 82); Prague, Protectorate of Bohemia and Moravia
- Education: Czech Technical University in Prague; Academy of Fine Arts, Prague
- Occupation: Architect

Martin Rajniš (born 16 May 1944) is a Czech architect, urbanist and professor. His architecture design career spans over fifty years and he taught at Academy of Arts, Architecture and Design in Prague from 1990 a 1997 and later at the Technical University of Liberec. He designed high-tech buildings in the 1980s and 1990s, and since 2000, he shifted the materiality and aesthetics of his designs from steel and concrete to "naturalistic" wood, stone and glass, resulting in a number of experimental and organically shaped structures. Rajniš is critical of engineered communist-era architecture, especially concrete tower blocks.

In 2014 he received the Global Award for Sustainable Architecture and has multiple nominations for the European Union Prize for Contemporary Architecture – Mies van der Rohe Award.

== Biography ==
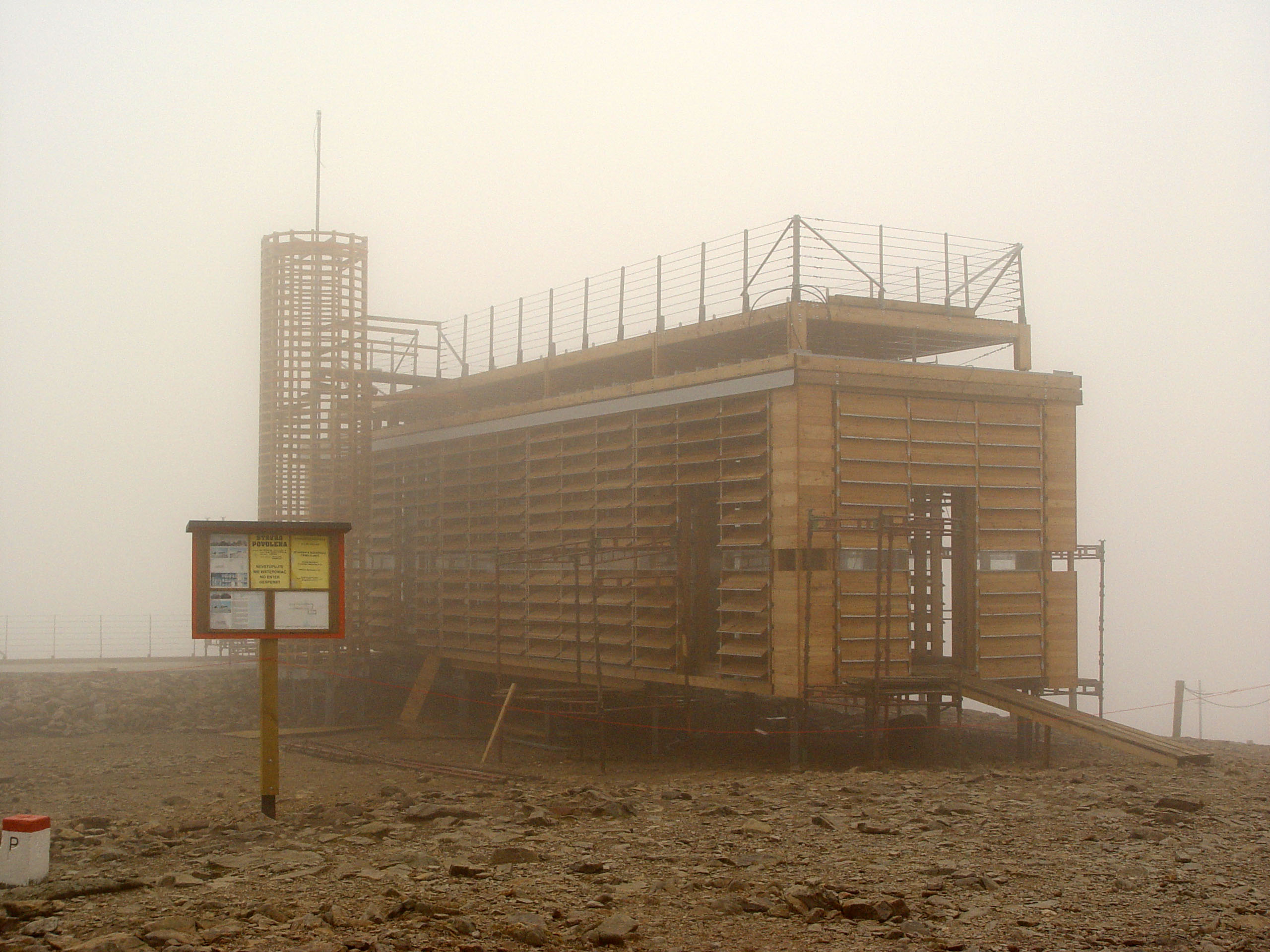
Post office, Sněžka

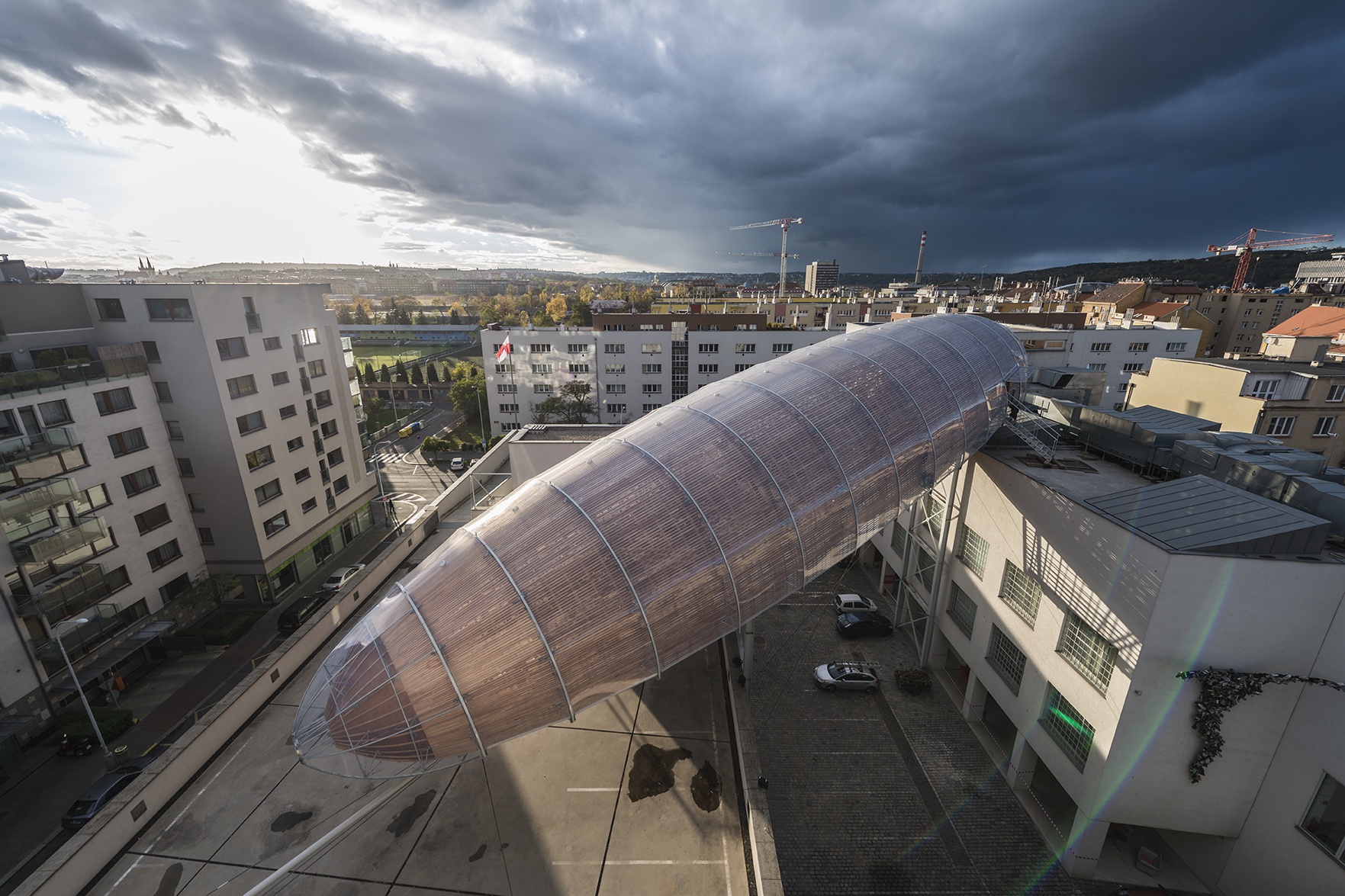
Gulliver auditorium, Prague

=== Before 1989 ===
Martin Rajniš was born in Prague on 16 May 1944, under the Protectorate of Bohemia and Moravia. He studied at the Faculty of Architecture of the Czech Technical University in Prague in 1962–1969. In periods during his studies, he worked as a laborer: in West Germany in 1965 on the renovation of the Cologne Cathedral, and in 1968 in the Netherlands, where he participated in local protests against the Warsaw Pact invasion of Czechoslovakia. He subsequently returned to Czechoslovakia and completed his studies at the Czech Technical University in 1969. He followed with a two-year postgraduate degree at the Academy of Fine Arts, Prague (under the guidance of Prof. Cubra).

From 1969, he was employed during the following ten years in the progressive SIAL studio in Liberec, led by architects Karel Hubáček and Miroslav Masák. At SIAL, alongside John Eisler and Masák, he designed the winning competition proposal of the Máj shopping center. It was built by 1975 and it became the second department store in Prague after Kotva, as part of the Prior retail chain.

Between 1979 and 1986, Rajniš collaborated through Studio Shape founded by Jaromír Hník on designs and management of exhibitions for largely foreign clients. This was mediated by a state-owned enterprise dedicated to exporting works of Czech artists - the Art Centrum. Via this arrangement, Rajniš designed the History of Transport pavilion at the World Exhibition EXPO 1986 in Vancouver together with Hník, Petr Hořejš and Jiří Černý.

In 1986, Rajniš co-founded D.A. Studio with colleagues Markéta Cajthamlová, Lev Lauermann, who were subsequently joined by Stanislav Fiala, Jaroslav Zima, Tomáš Prouza and Jan Mleziva. The D.A. studio designed projects until 1996, among which is the Nový Smíchov shopping center in Prague district of Smíchov. It opened in 2001 on the site of the former Ringhoffer factory. Rajniš also participated in the redesigning of the urban plan of the Anděl area within Smíchov district.

=== Since 1990 ===
Between 1990 and 1997, Rajniš taught at the Academy of Arts, Architecture and Design in Prague with his assistant Jakub Cigler and later also taught at the Technical University of Liberec. In 1993, he was appointed a professor, and between 1992 and 1995 he was a member of the jury of the Czech Chamber of Architects. In 1996, Rajniš departed from the D.A. Studio (which was later renamed to D3A) and went on to travel extensively over the next four years. By 2000 he had travelled throughout four continents, partially via sailing as the mode transportation. He gradually returned to architectural design after 2000.

Between 2003 and 2005 he worked alongside Patrik Hoffman and since 2005 he works alongside David Kubík. In 2007, the Post Office on Sněžka project was completed. In 2010, the Czech exhibition from 29 August to 21 November at the 12th International Venice Biennale of Architecture was designed by Rajniš. In 2012, Martin Rajniš co-founded the atelier named Huť architektury Martin Rajniš based in Prague with Kubík and later also Tomáš Kosnar as a partner. Since 2012, he has led practical student workshops focused on sculptural wooden structures.

In 2014, Rajniš was elected chairman of the Prague Institute of Planning and Development. In 2021, the authorities of Prague awarded Rajniš with the honorary medal of the capital city for significant lifetime achievements in the field of architecture.

== Architectural style and theory ==
Early works of Rajniš dated from the 1980s and 1990s have an international modernist or functionalist aesthetic of high-tech style inspired by neo-functionalism and brutalism. In the period following 2000, Rajniš shifted the materiality and aesthetics of his designs from steel and concrete to "naturalistic" wood, stone and glass, resulting in experimental and organically shaped structures. Rajniš has criticized engineered communist-era architecture, especially concrete tower blocks. Rajniš published a manifesto of architecture where he explores topics such as diversity, symbiosis, adaptability, economy and ecology. His theory on urban planning is based on pedestrian's and city-dweller's everyday experience of the city, human scale that enables communication and social interaction rather than planning that is subordinated to economic productivity and spatial efficiency.

== Notable projects ==
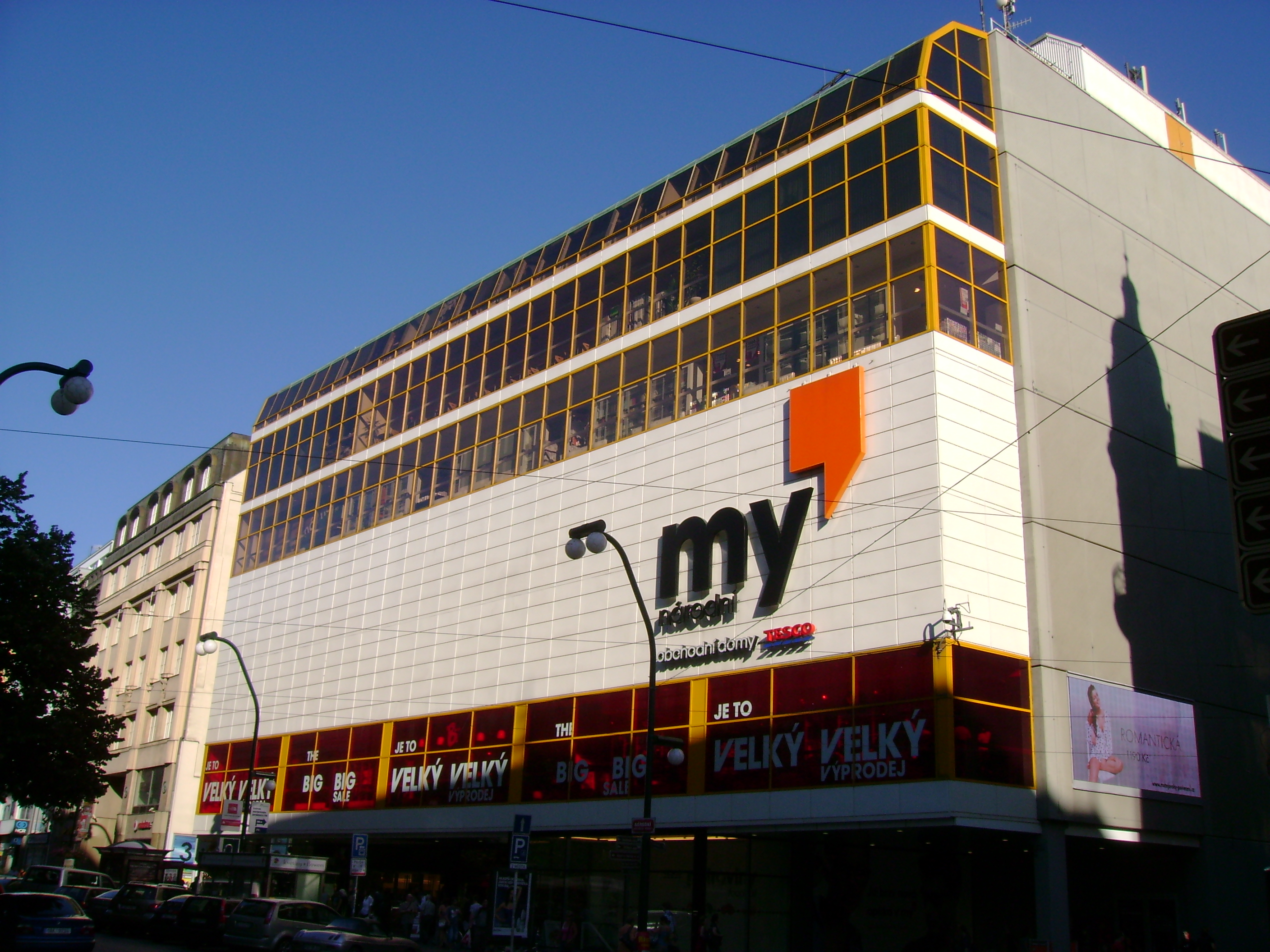
Máj shopping mall

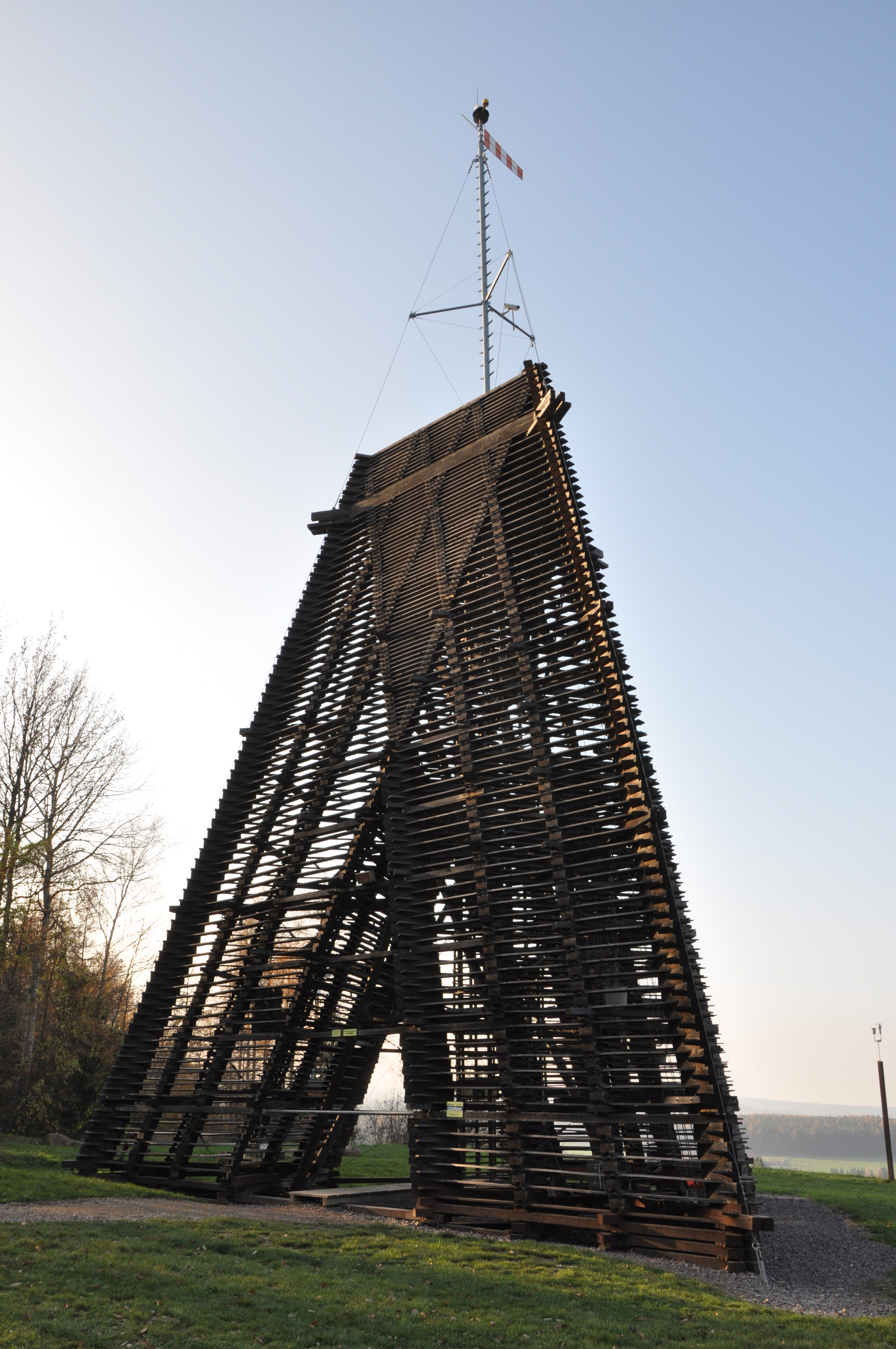
Bára lookout tower

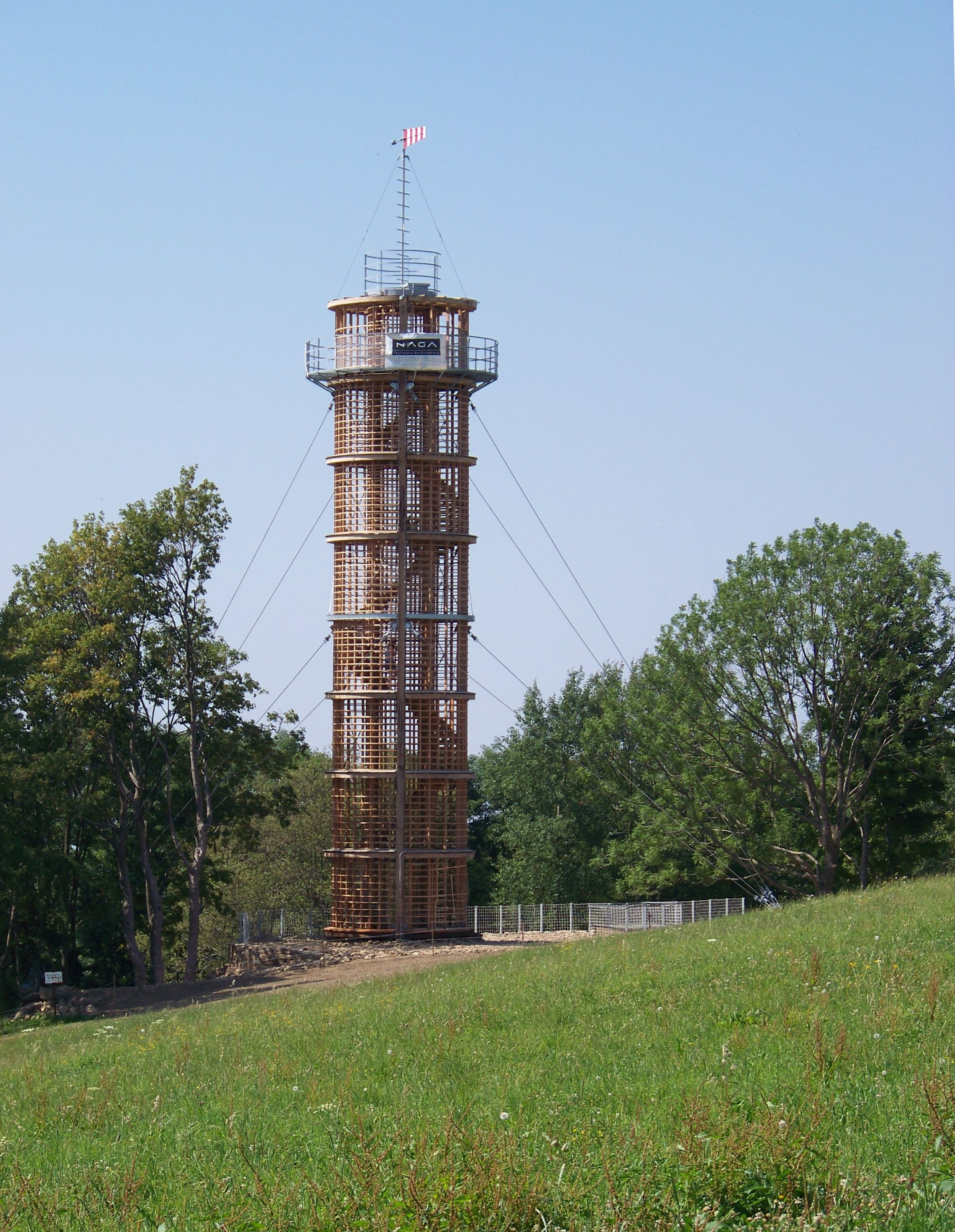
Cimrman's lookout tower

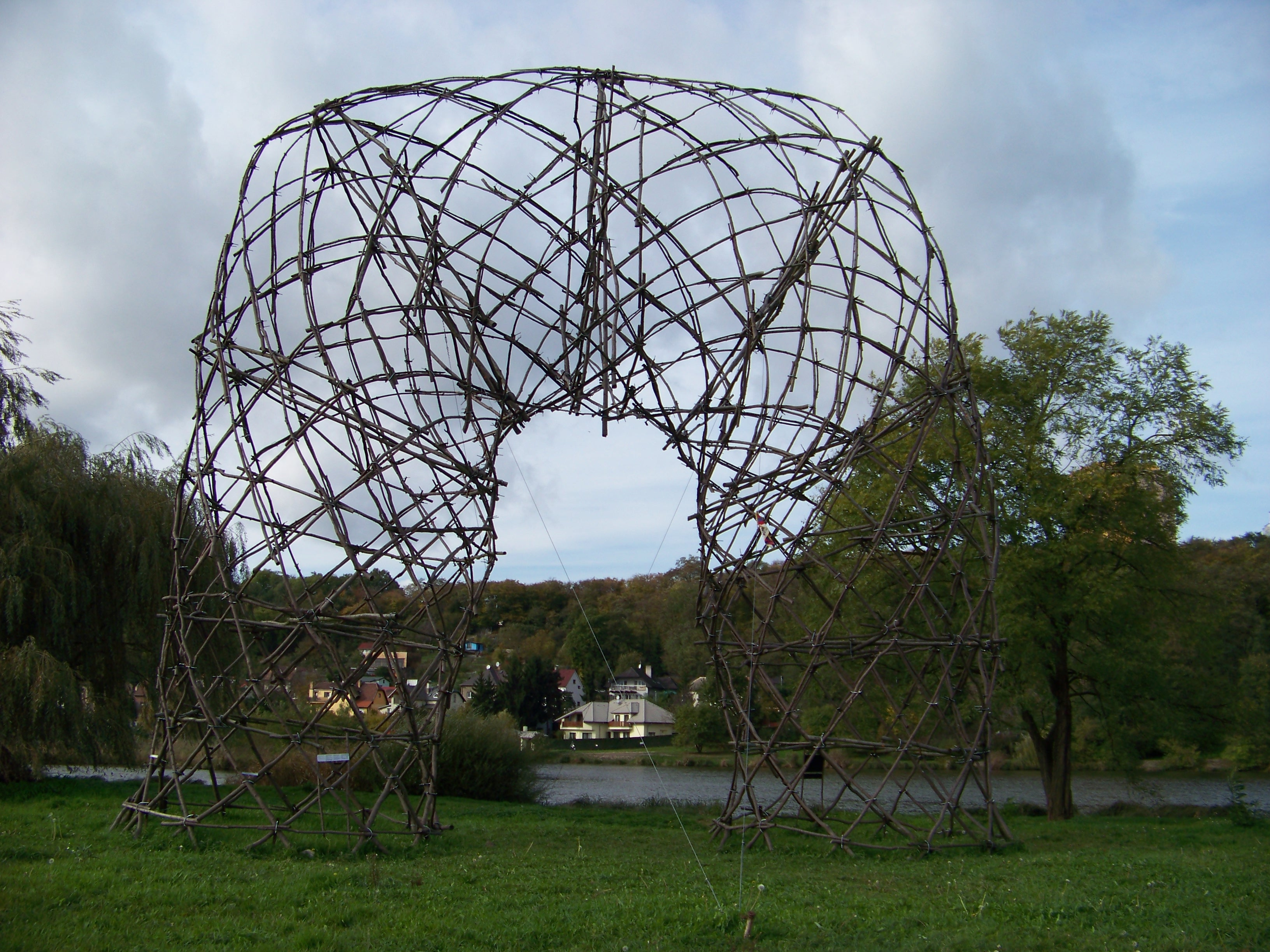
Artefakt sculptural structure

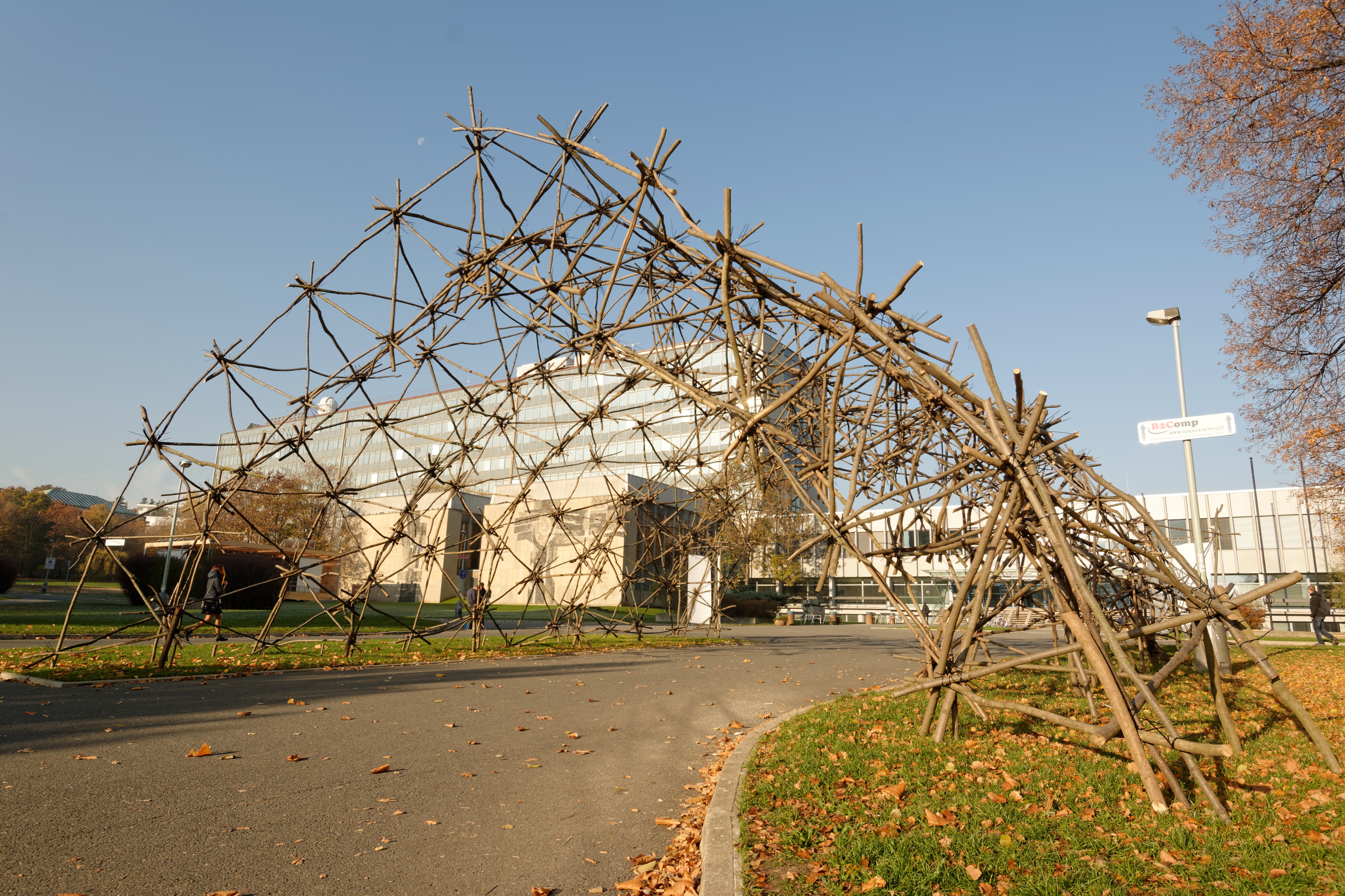
Dome of Chaos sculptural structure

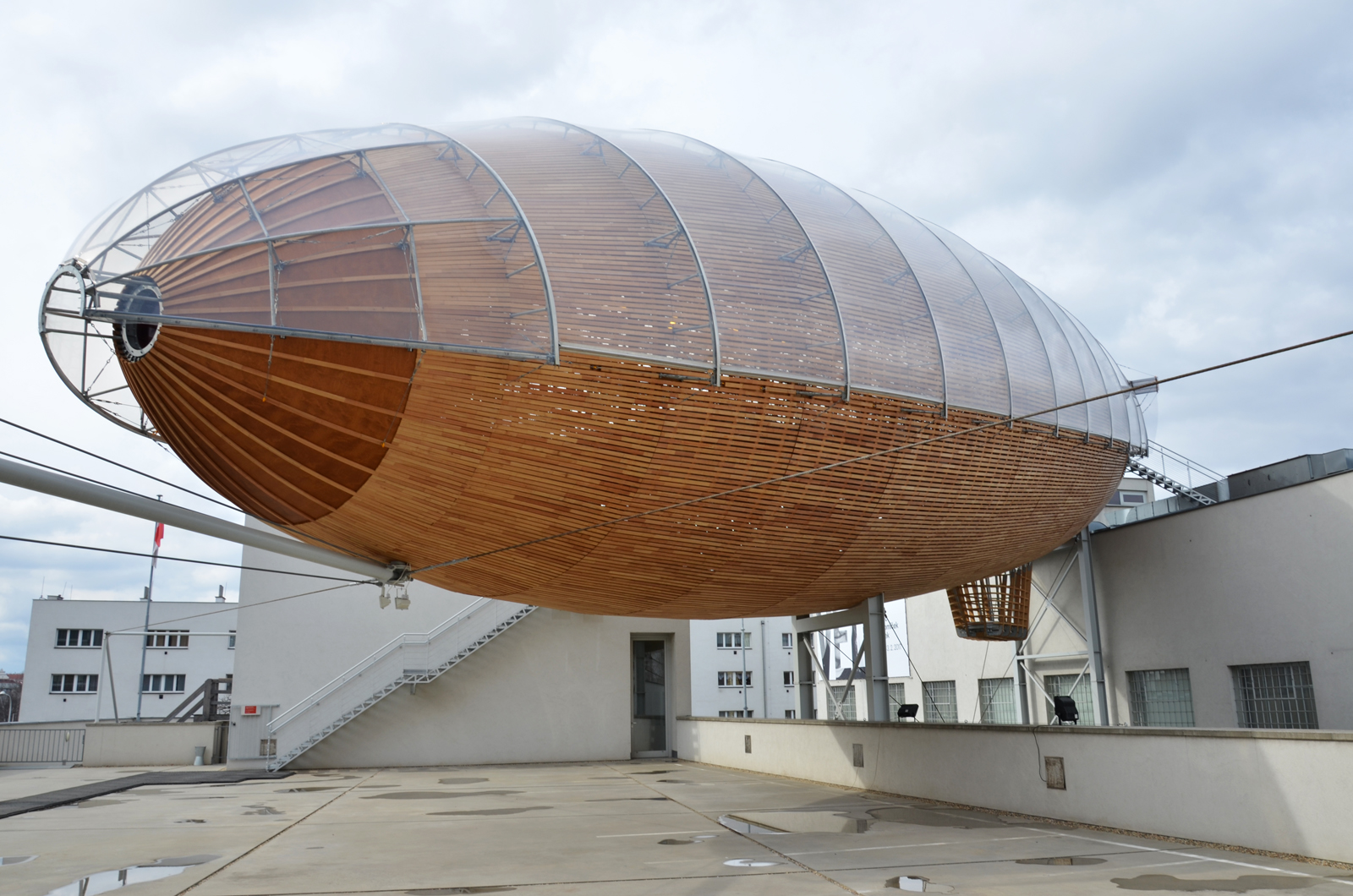
Gulliver "airship" auditorium at the DOX Centre for Contemporary Art

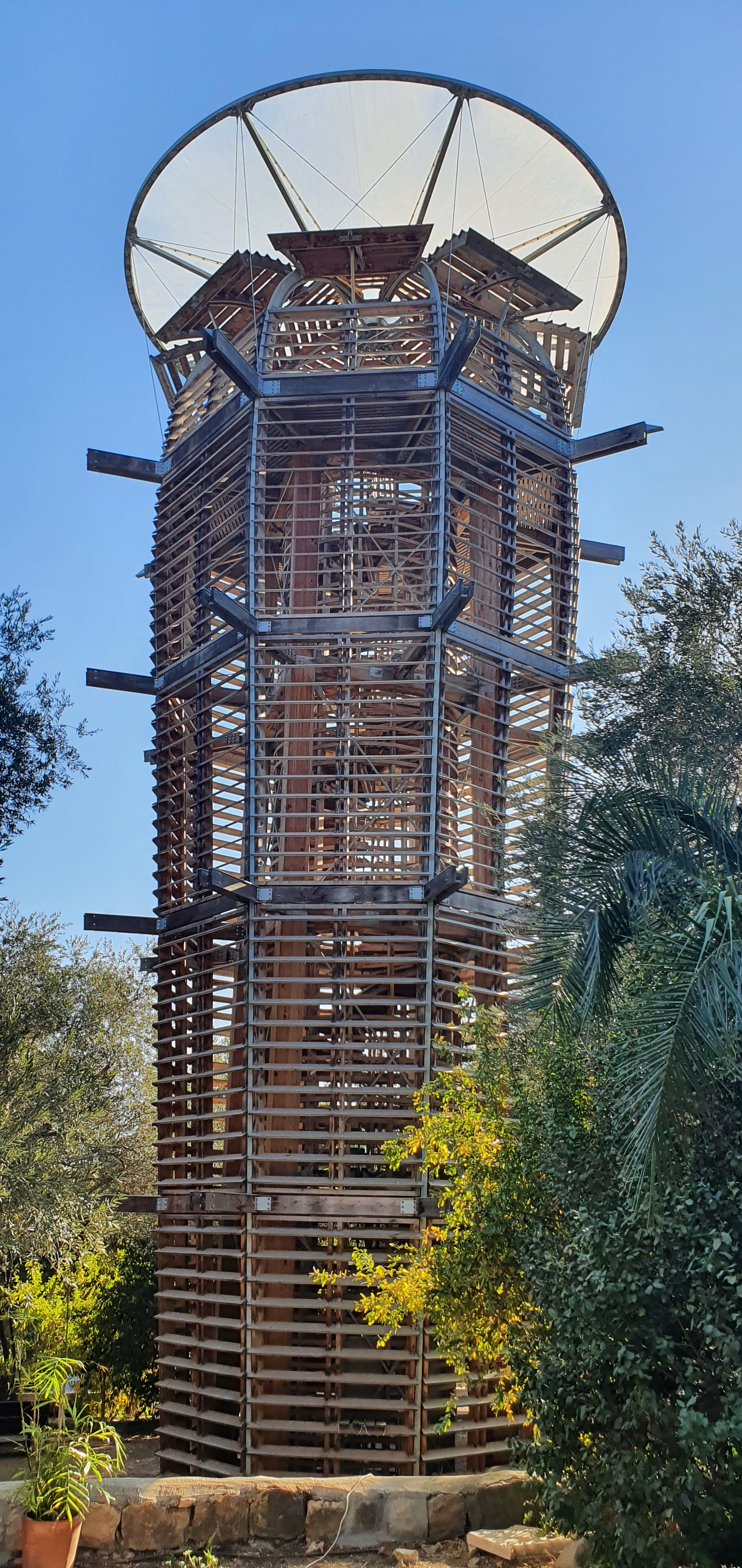
Ester lookout tower, Jerusalem

== Awards ==
- Nominated for the European Union Prize for Contemporary Architecture – Mies van der Rohe Award in 2004
- Nominated for the European Union Prize for Contemporary Architecture – Mies van der Rohe Award in 2008
- Global Award for Sustainable Architecture in 2014
- Nominated for the European Union Prize for Contemporary Architecture – Mies van der Rohe Award in 2014
- Nominated for the European Union Prize for Contemporary Architecture – Mies van der Rohe Award in 2018

== Bibliography ==
- Rajniš, Martin; Fialová, Irena. D.A.Studio. Projekty a realizace 1986/1996. Praha, GJF, 1995.
- Rajniš, Martin; Fialová, Irena; Tichá, Jana. Martin Rajniš. Praha, Zlatý řez. 2008. ISBN 978-80-87068-02-1
- Tichá, Jana. Bára, Neuvěřitelný příběh věže / Bára, The incredible story of a tower. Praha, Zlatý řez. 2010. ISBN 978-80-87068-06-9
- Rajniš, Martin; Šebestová, Magdalena. Pětadvacet tisíc dnů vzpomínek. Argo, Praha. 2016. ISBN 978-80-257-1970-1
- Horský, Jiří; Rajniš, Martin. Martin Rajniš: Skici – Sketches. Praha, KANT, 2016. ISBN 978-80-7437-213-1
- Rajniš, Martin; Kosnar, Tomáš. Transborder Chrastava. Praha, Huť architektury Martin Rajniš, 2021. ISBN 978-80-908201-0-4
- Rajniš, Martin; Kosnar, Tomáš. Máminka Hudlice. Praha, Huť architektury Martin Rajniš, 2021. ISBN 978-80-908201-1-1
- Rajniš, Martin; Kosnar, Tomáš. Gulliver DOX Praha. Praha, Huť architektury Martin Rajniš, 2021. ISBN 978-80-908201-2-8
- Rajniš, Martin; Kosnar, Tomáš. Klinika Dr. Pírka. Praha, Huť architektury Martin Rajniš, 2021. ISBN 978-80-908201-4-2
- Rajniš, Martin; Kosnar, Tomáš. Doubravka Praha 14. Praha, Huť architektury Martin Rajniš, 2021. ISBN 978-80-908201-5-9
- Rajniš, Martin; Huť architektury Martin Rajniš. KANT. 2022. 526 stran. ISBN 9788074373695.
