= Takaharu Tezuka =

Japanese architect (born 1964)

- Born: 23 February 1964 (age 62); Tokyo, Japan
- Occupation: Architect
- Awards: Japan Institute of Architects Prize (2002 & 2009); Yoshioka Prize (2002); Architectural Institution of Japan Prize (2008); Global Award for Sustainable Architecture (2017)
- Practice: Tezuka Architects

Takaharu Tezuka (手塚 貴晴, Tezuka Takaharu; born 23 February 1964) is a Japanese architect. In 1994, he and his wife Yui Tezuka founded the Tokyo-based firm Tezuka Architects. Projects by Tezuka Architects include the Roof House, Echigo-Matsunoyama Museum of Natural Science, Fuji Kindergarten and Woods of Net. Their recent awards include Japan Institute of Architects Prize (2009), Association for Children's Environment Design Award (2011), OECD/CELE 4th Compendium of Exemplary Educational Facilities (2011) and a Global Award for Sustainable Architecture (2017).

== Career ==
Born in Tokyo, Japan in 1964, Takaharu Tezuka studied architecture at Musashi Institute of Technology and at the University of Pennsylvania. He then went to London where he spent four years with the Richard Rogers Partnership. In 1994, together with his wife, Yui Tezuka, he established Tezuka Architects in Tokyo. The couple's work emphasizes human activity and connectivity as can be seen in their schools, office buildings and hospitals.

=== Brief career history ===
- 1964 Born in Tokyo
- 1987 B.Arch., Musashi Institute of Technology
- 1990 M.Arch., University of Pennsylvania
- 1990–1994 Richard Rogers Partnership Ltd.
- 1994 Established, Tezuka Architects
- 1996–2003 Assistant Professor, Musashi Institute of Technology
- 2005, 06 Visiting Professor, Salzburg Summer Academy
- 2006 Visiting Professor, University of California, Berkeley
- 2009– Professor, Tokyo City University

=== Main works ===
- 1996 – Soejima Hospital
- 1999 – Wood Deck House
- 2000 – Megaphone House
- 2000 – Kawagoe Music Apartment
- 2001 – Roof House
- 2001 – Balcony House
- 2001 – Wall-less House
- 2002 – Saw Roof House
- 2003 – Matsunoyama Natural Science Museum
- 2003 – Engawa House
- 2003 – TOYOTA L&F HIROSHIMA
- 2003 – House to catch the sky III
- 2005 – Visionary Arts, Tokyo
- 2005 – Floating Roof House
- 2006 – Eaves House
- 2006 – Sandou house
- 2006 – Observatory Room House
- 2006 – My Own Sky House
- 2007 – Cloister House
- 2007 – Fuji Kindergarten
- 2007 -House to Catch the Sunlight
- 2007 – Kanjoin Kannondo
- 2007 – Kumejima Eef Beach Hotel
- 2007 – House to Catch the Hill
- 2007 – Wilful Townhouse
- 2007 – House to Catch the Sea
- 2007 – GRV
- 2007 – Temple to catch the forest
- 2009 – Woods of Net
- 2009 – Pitched Roof House
- 2009 – Drawer House
- 2009 – Umbrella House
- 2010 – House of Ship
- 2010 – Snail House
- 2011 – Step House in a Shopping Street
- 2011 – Ring Around a Tree
- 2011 – OG Giken Tokyo branch
- 2012 – OG Giken Kyushu branch
- 2012 – House to Catch the Mountain
- 2012 – Deck House
- 2012 – Asahi Kindergarten
- 2012 – Yamamotochou Fuji Kindergarten
- 2013 – Child Chemo House
- 2013 – Chigasaki Zion Christian Church/Mihato Kindergarten

=== Fuji Kindergarten ===
Fuji Kindergarten in Japan, designed by architect Takaharu Tezuka, emphasizing the idea that children do not need to be forced to learn but naturally cannot stop. The kindergarten is an open-air kindergarten, designed to encourage and facilitate social interaction between students as well as discovery-style learning. Students are encouraged to design their own learning environment through the use of crates to separate classrooms, trees are left to grow within the structure of the kindergarten that students are able to climb, and additional structures within the kindergarten allow for exploration for students to delve into and discover in a collaborative manner.

=== Exhibitions ===
- Japan-Poland: New Architecture / 1994–2004
- Venice Biennale / 2004
- Aichi Expo, Japan /2005
- Gallery Ma, Japan / 2006
- London Biennale /2006
- Inax Gallery, Tokyo /2007
- Deutsches Architektur Museum Exhibition, Frankfurt /2009
- Contemplating The Void: Interventions In The Guggenneim Museum, New York/ 2010
- JapanLisztRaiding, Austria/2010
- Carnegie International 2013

=== Awards ===
- 1997 – Ministry of International Trade and Industry, Good Design Gold Prize (Soejima Hospital)
- 1998 – Architectural Institution of Japan, Annual Architectural Commendations (Soejima Hospital)
- 2002 – Japan Institute of Architects Prize (Roof House) Yoshioka Prize
- 2002 – Yoshioka Foundation (Roof House)
- 2003 – Architectural Institution of Japan, Annual Architectural Commendations (Roof House)
- 2003 – Good Design Prize, Japan Industrial Design Organization, (Styrene foam sofa)
- 2004 – Good Design Prize, Japan Industrial Design Organization (Hounancho "L" Condominium)
- 2004 – Ecobuild Award, Ecobuild Japan (Echigo-matsunoyama Museum of Natural Science)
- 2004 – the Architectural Review (Echigo-matsunoyama Museum of Natural Science)
- 2005 – Architectural Institution of Japan, Annual Architectural Commendations (Matsunoyama Natural Science Museum)
- 2007 – Ministry of Economy, Trade and Industry, Interaction Design Prize (Fuji Kindergarten)
- 2007 – Ministry of Economy, Trade and Industry, Kids Design Gold Prize (Fuji Kindergarten)
- 2007 – Association for Children's Environment, ACE Award Design Category (Fuji Kindergarten)
- 2007 – Design for Asia Grand Award (Fuji Kindergarten)
- 2007 – Highly Commended, the Architectural Review (Fuji Kindergarten)
- 2008 – Architectural Institution of Japan Prize (Fuji Kindergarten)
- 2009 – The Japan Institute of Architects Prize, the Japan Institute of Architects (Fuji Kindergarten)
- 2009 – The Architecture Award, Asia Pacific Property Awards 2009 (Fuji Kindergarten)
- 2011 – Association for Children's Environment Design Award (Woods of Net)
- 2011 – The Best of All, OECD/CELE 4th Compendium of Exemplary Educational Facilities (Fuji Kindergarten)
- 2011 – Good Design Prize, Japan Industrial Design Organization (OG Giken Tokyo Branch)
- 2013 – Association for Children's Environment Design Award (Asahi Kindergarten)
- 2013 – Architectural Institution of Japan, Annual Architectural Commendations (Ring Around a Tree)
- 2013 – Good Design Gold Award, Japan Industrial Design Organization (Asahi Kindergarten)
- 2013 – Good Design Prize, Japan Industrial Design Organization (OG Giken Kyushu branch)
- 2017 – Global Award for Sustainable Architecture

=== Publication ===
- Tezuka, Takaharu, and Yui Tezuka. Takaharu + Yui Tezuka Architecture Catalogue. Tokyo: TOTO Publishing, 2006.
- Tezuka, Takaharu, and Yui Tezuka. Takaharu + Yui Tezuka Architecture Catalogue 2. Tokyo: TOTO Publishing, 2009.
- Tezuka, Takaharu, and Yui Tezuka. Takaharu + Yui Tezuka Architecture Catalogue 3. Tokyo: TOTO Publishing, 2015.
- Tezuka, Takaharu, and Yui Tezuka. Takaharu + Yui Tezuka NOSTALGIC FUTURE ERINNERTE ZUKUNFT. Edited by Paul Andreas and Peter Cachola Schmal. JOVIS Verlag Berlin 2009 ISBN 978-3-86859-021-0
- Tezuka, Takaharu, and Yui Tezuka. ROOFLESS ARCHITECTURE / Summer Academy Salzburg. Edited by Miyako Nairz. Salzburg: Huttegger, 2008.
- Tezuka, Takaharu, and Yui Tezuka. FLOORLESS ARCHITECTURE / Summer Academy Salzburg. Edited by Miyako Nairz. Salzburg: Huttegger, 2008.
- Tezuka Architects – The Yellow Book, JOVIS Verlag Berlin 2016, ISBN 978-3-86859-423-2
