= Global Award for Sustainable Architecture =

Architecture award

- Awarded for: Contributing to a more equitable and sustainable development.
- Sponsored by: Saint Gobain
- First award: 2007

The Global Award for Sustainable Architecture is an international architecture founded in 2006 by architect and scholar Jana Revedin.

== Description ==
Each year, the award honors five architects who "contribute to a more equitable and sustainable development and create an innovative and participatory approach to meet the needs of societies," whether they are experts in economics, construction, or self-development actors for whom sustainability is synonymous with social and urban equity.

The Scientific Committee of the Award counts on scholars from the Mimar Sinan University Istanbul, the International Architecture Biennale Ljubljana and the Università Iuav Venice. Since 2010, the Global Award for Sustainable Architecture has been under the patronage of UNESCO.

The laureates of the Global Award for Sustainable Architecture are selected by the Global Award Scientific Committee.

== Laureates ==
=== 2025 ===
- Andrea Gebhard, Urban and landscape planner, Germany
- Marie Combette and Daniel Moreno Flores, Architects, Ecuador
- Salima Naji, Anthropologist, architect and artist, Morocco
- Hoàng Thúc Hào, Architect and researcher, Vietnam
- Marie and Keith Zawistowski, Architects, France

=== 2024 ===
The 2024 edition rises the topic: "Architecture Is Education"

- Iyas Shahin and Wesam Al Asali of IWLAB Laboratory, Syria and Spain
- Andrés Jaque, founder of Office for Political Innovation (OFFPOLINN)
- Marina Tabassum, founder of Marina Tabassum Architects in Bangladesh
- Ciro Pirondi, cofounder of Escola da Cidade in Brazil
- Klaus K. Loenhart, architect and landscape designer, Institute of Architecture and Landscape in Graz, Germany and Austria

=== 2023 ===
The 2023 edition rises the question: "Architecture is experimentation"

- Benedetta Tagliabué – Barcelona, Spain.
- Xu Tiantian, architect, DnA Design and Architecture, Beijing, China.
- Simon Teyssou – architect, Atelier du Rouget Simon Teyssou & associés, Le Rouget-Pers, Cantal, France.
- Mette Ramsgaard Thomsen – architect, Royal Danish Academy, Copenhagen, Denmark.
- Ronald Rietveld – architect, artist, and ERIK RIETVELD philosopher, RAAAF, Amsterdam, Netherlands.

=== 2022 ===
The 2022 edition rises the question: "The Territory: Threat or Opportunity?"

- Anupama Kundoo, Auroville, Berlin
- Dorte Mandrup – Copenhague, Denmark
- Martin Rauch, Schlins, Vorarlberg
- Okan Bal & Ömer Selçuk Baz, Yalin Architectural Design, Istanbul
- Gilles Clément, Crozant

=== 2021 ===
The 2021 edition rises the question: "Architecture and Nature: a new Synergie?"

- Teresa Moller – Santiago, Chile
- Solano Benitez & Gloria Cabral – Asuncion, Paraguay
- Severiano Porto – Manaus, Brazil
- José Cubilla – Asuncion, Paraguay
- Richard Sennett – London, UK

=== 2019 ===
The 2019 edition celebrates the Centenary of Walter Gropius’ Bauhaus by honoring "the multidisciplinary and social-reformatory aim of the Bauhaus" that is: "Architecture is science, art and crafts at the service of society."

- Rozana Montiel, Estudio de Arquitectura – Mexico City, Mexico
- Werner Sobek, Director of the Institut of Lightweight Structures and Conceptual Design (ILEK) – Stuttgart, Germany
- Ersen Gürsel, EPA architects – Istanbul, Turkey
- Ammar Khammash, Khammash Architects – Amman, Jordan
- Jorge Lobos, Founder of Emergency Architecture & Human Rights (EAHR) – Copenhagen, Denmark / Arquitecto Jorge Lobos – Puerto Montt, Chile

=== 2018 ===
The 2018 edition's theme is "Architecture as an agent of civic empowerment".

- Boonserm Premthada, Bangkok Projects Studio – Bangkok, Thailand
- Nina Maritz, Nina Maritz architects – Klein Windhoek, Namibia
- Marta Maccaglia, Asociación Semillas – Pangoa, Peru
- Anne Lacaton & Jean-Philippe Vassal and Frédéric Druot – Paris, France
- Raumlabor – Berlin, Germany

=== 2017 ===
The 2017 edition is dedicated to the "invisible resources": "an architecture of resources which includes the immaterial and invisible agents of time, rights, community, processes, flows, interdisciplinary dialogue, resilience, senses and experimentation."

- MacKay-Lyons Sweetapple Architects Limited – Halifax, Nova Scotia, Canada
- Sonam Wangchuk – Leh, Ladakh, India
- Assemble – London, Great Britain
- Takaharu and Yui Tezuka, Tezuka Architects – Tokyo, Japan
- Paulo David – Madeira, Funchal, Portugal

=== 2016 ===
The 2016 edition - Jury held during the terrorist attacks to Paris' Bataclan - is dedicated to "Liberty of Thought"

- Patrice Doat – Grenoble, France
- Kengo Kuma – Tokyo, Japan
- CASE Studio, Patama Roonrakwit – Bangkok, Thailand
- Gion A. Caminada – Vrin, Switzerland
- East Coast Architects – Durban, South Africa

=== 2015 ===
- Talca School of Architecture – Talca, Chile
- Santiago Cirugeda – Recetas Urbanas, Sevilla, Spain
- Jan Gehl – Copenhagen, Denmark
- Rotor – Brussels, Belgium
- Marco Casagrande – Helsinki, Finland / Taiwan

=== 2014 ===
- Christopher Alexander – Arundel, Great Britain / Berkeley, California, USA
- Tatiana Bilbao – Mexico City, Mexico
- Bernd Gundermann, Urbia Group – Auckland, New Zealand
- Martin Rajniš – Prague, Czech Republic
- West 8 – Rotterdam, The Netherlands

=== 2013 ===
- José Paulo dos Santos – Porto, Portugal
- Kevin Low, Smallprojects – Kuala Lumpur, Malaysia
- Al Borde Arquitectos (David Barragán, Pascual Gangotena, Marialuisa Borja, Esteban Benavides) – Quito, Ecuador
- Lake/Flato Architects, David Lake and Ted Flato – San Antonio, Texas, USA
- MDW Architecture, Marie Moignot, Xavier De Wil and Gilles Debrun – Brussels, Belgium

=== 2012 ===
- Salma Samar Damluji – London, UK
- Anne Feenstra – Kabul, Afghanistan
- Suriya Umpansiriratana – Bangkok, Thailand
- Philippe Madec – Paris, France
- TYIN tegnestue Architects – Trondheim, Norway

=== 2011 ===
- Shlomo Aronson – Jerusalem
- Vatnavinir – Reykjavik, Iceland
- Anna Heringer – Laufen, Germany
- Teddy Cruz – Tijuana, Mexico / San Diego, California, USA
- Carmen Arrospide Poblete, Patronato de Cultura Machupicchu – Cuzco, Peru

=== 2010 ===
- Troppo Architects – Darwin, Australia
- Jun'ya Ishigami – Tokyo, Japan
- Giancarlo Mazzanti – Bogota, Colombia
- Kjetil Thorsen Trædal, Snøhetta – Oslo, Norway
- Steve Baer – Albuquerque, New Mexico, USA

=== 2009 ===
- Patrick Bouchain and Loïc Julienne – France
- Thomas Herzog – Munich, Germany
- Bijoy Jain, Studio Mumbai – Mumbai, India
- Diébédo Francis Kéré – Berlin, Germany / Gando, Burkina Faso
- Sami Rintala – Bodo, Norway

=== 2008 ===
- Andrew Freear, Rural Studio – Auburn, Alabama, USA
- Fabrizio Carola – Naples, Italy / Bamako, Mali
- Alejandro Aravena, Elemental – Santiago, Chile
- Carin Smuts, CS Studio Architects – Cape Town, South Africa
- Philippe Samyn, Philippe Samyn & Partners – Brussels, Belgium

=== 2007 ===
- Hermann Kaufmann – Schwarzach, Vorarlberg, Austria
- Balkrishna Doshi, Vastu-Shilpa Foundation – Ahmedabad, India
- Françoise-Hélène Jourda – Paris, France
- Wang Shu and Lu Wenyu – Hangzhou, China
- Stefan Behnisch, Behnisch Architekten – Stuttgart, Germany
