= Hoàng Thúc Hào =

Vietnamese architect (born 1971)

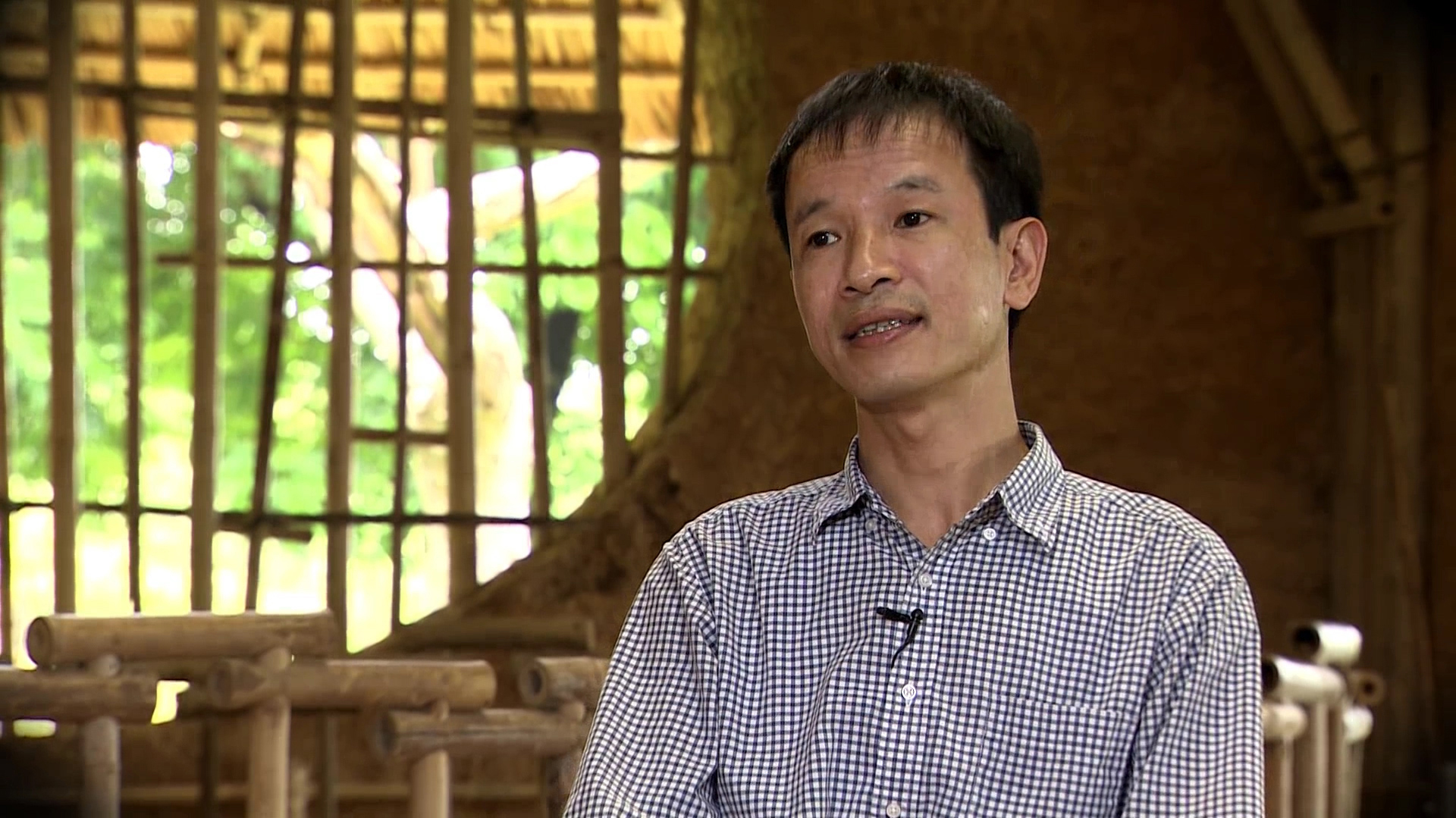
- Born: 1971 (age 54–55); Hanoi
- Occupation: Architect
- Organizations: Vietnam Association of Architects; Hanoi University of Civil Engineering; 1+1>2 Architects
- Website: hoangthuchao.vn

Hoàng Thúc Hào (born 1971) is a Vietnamese architect. He is currently the Vice President of the Vietnam Association of Architects. He graduated from the Faculty of Architecture and Planning, Hanoi University of Civil Engineering in 1992, and obtained a postgraduate degree from Turin Polytechnic University in 2002.

In 2003, Hoàng Thúc Hào began teaching at the Hanoi University of Civil Engineering. He also founded "1+1>2 Architects", an architecture office dedicated to social projects which focuses on supporting disadvantaged communities and promoting cultural diversity in the context of rapid urbanization. Hoàng Thúc Hào and 1+1>2 Architects have been recognized with nearly 100 prestigious domestic and international awards.

He proposed the philosophy of “Architecture of Happiness” - emphasizing that architecture is not merely about designing and creating spaces, but also has the potential to bring fairness and happiness.

== Career ==
Hoàng Thúc Hào became the first Vietnamese to achieve the SIA-GETZ Award for Outstanding Architect in Asia (2016), Global Awards for Sustainable Architecture (2025), and two major triennial awards from the International Union of Architects (UIA). These include the 2017 Vassilis Sgoutas Prize for Implemented Architecture Serving the Impoverished and the 2023 Robert Matthew Prize for Sustainable and Humane Environments.

In 2015, he was the winner at the World Architecture Festival in the Civic and Community category. More recently, he received the Gold Medal of Arcasia Awards for Architecture in the Public Amenity category (2020).

Along with that, he actively shares his expertise through exhibitions and lectures at many universities, such as the Art Institute of Chicago, Yale University, Cornell University, National University of Singapore, Berlin Institute of Art, Polytechnic University of Puerto Rico, University of Quebec (Canada), Guangzhou Academy of Fine Arts, Tsinghua University, École Spéciale d'Architecture (Paris), Inner Mongolia University of Technology (China),...

UIA stated:

“Hoàng Thúc Hào pays special attention to rural areas and poor communities, highlighting the role of architects in the process of construction and social innovation. Deeply understanding and adapting to local conditions , he was known to pioneered innovations. People participate and are an indispensable part of the construction process, empowered to improve their own living environment. He not only aims for sustainability in construction, more importantly, he respects and develops cultural values in his works - an aspect that is often neglected in developing economies.”

“Hoàng Thúc Hào is one of the few Vietnamese architects with a clear community mindset in combining the natural environment and the living environment with strong community and cultural connections.”

== Selected works ==
- Suoi Re Community House (Hoa Binh) – 2009
- Ta Phin Community House (Lao Cai) – 2012
- Children's playground system (Hoi An) – 2013
- Canh En Community House (Ha Giang) – 2015
- Cam Thanh Community House (Hoi An) – 2015
- Lung Luong Primary School (Thai Nguyen) – 2015
- Bhutan Happiness Center (Bhutan) – 2016
- Anti-flood House Chain in Quang Ninh, Quang Binh, Quang Nam Province – 2013–2016
- Countryside House (Dong Nai) – 2016
- Bottle House System – 2016
- Workers' Housing (Lao Cai) – 2016
- Hanging Village - Dream Residence (Hanoi) – 2017
- Chieng Yen Community House (Son La) – 2017
- Sentia School (Hanoi) – 2018
- Sapa O'Chau Lodge (Lao Cai) – 2018
- Jackfruit Village (Hanoi) – 2019
- Da Hop Kindergarten & Primary School (Hoa Binh) – 2019
- An Binh Meditation Village (Yen Bai) – 2019
- Dewey School Westlake (Hanoi) – 2020
- Vietnam Institute for Advanced Study in Mathematics (Hanoi) – 2020
- Pixel Vertical Village (Hanoi) – 2020
- Bat Trang Ceramic Community Center (Hanoi) – 2021
- Museum of Contemporary Art – 2021
- Hanoi Adelaide School (Hanoi) – 2021
- Na Khoang School (Son La) – 2021
- Truc Lam Restaurant (Hanoi) – 2021
- Phenikaa School – 2021
- Lung Vai School (Ha Giang) – 2022
- Binh Dinh Museum Project (Binh Dinh) – 2022
- Westlink School (Hanoi) – 2022
- OakVillage - 9th Avenue Residence (Myanmar) – 2022
- CIS Inter-level School (Lao Cai) – 2023
- Brighton College Vietnam (Hanoi) – 2023
- VinSchool Ocean Park 2 (Hanoi) – 2024
- Dewey Ocean Park School (Hanoi) – 2024
- Vien Giac Pagoda (Hue) – 2024
- Lam Son Community House (Thanh Hoa) – 2024
- Highland school system (designing more than 110 schools in remote areas) – 2014–2024

== Awards ==
TT	Awards	Year
1	Special Prize - Word Triennial of Architecture SOFIA Awards for "Return to the Earth what it owns" - Conservation, Planning and Development of Bat Trang Pottery Village	1994
2	UIA Award - Paris | The Renovation of Hoa Lo Prison to Square of Tolerance	1996
3	First Prize of DAAD (Deutscher Akademischer Austausch Dienst), Vietnam - Germany Science and Technology Center	1996
4	Second Prize, Vietnam National Assembly Design Competition	2007
5	First Prize, "For Hanoi Today and Tomorrow" Competition	2008
6	Grand Prize, Urban Planning and Design Competition for Hoan Kiem Lake Area and Vicinity	2009
7	Bui Xuan Phai Award - For the Love of Hanoi	2010
8	Second Prize, UIA Barbara Cappochin Award	2011
9	Winner, World Architecture Festival (WAF) | Community Category	2015
10	Architect of the Year 2015, Ashui Awards	2015
11	We Choice Awards - Inspirational Ambassador (Chosen by the Judging Council)	2016
12	Gold Award, Vietnam Green Architecture	2016
13	SIA-Getz Architecture Award 2016 for Outstanding Asian Architects	2016
14	The Vassilis Sgoutas Prize for Implemented Architecture Serving the Impoverished UIA Triennial Grand Award	2017
15	Second-class Labor Medal	2017
16	Grand Prize, Planning and Architectural Design Competition for President Ho Chi Minh Memorial Area, Nam Dan, Nghe An	2019
17	Gold Prize Arcasia Architecture Awards	2020
18	The Robert Matthew Prize for Sustainable and Humane Environments UIA Triennial Grand Prize	2023
19	State Prize for Literature and Arts 2023	2023
20	07 Spec Go Green Awards	2014 - 2018
21	05 Futurarc Green Leadership Awards	2011 - 2020
22	13 Green Good Design Awards	2011 - 2024
23	06 Vietnam Green Architecture Awards	2013 - 2021
24	07 Arcasia Architecture Awards – AAA	2011 - 2021
25	23 National Architecture Awards	2006 - 2024
26	12 The International Architecture Awards - IAA Chicago	2011 - 2024
27	8 Architecture Master Prize	2018 - 2024
27	Winner of the Year - Design Educate Awards 2023	2023
29	ArchDaily Building of the Year 2024 in Educational Architecture category	2024
30	2 Prizes in Design Educate Awards	2024
31	Global Awards for Sustainable Architecture	2025
