= Jana Revedin =

German professor of architecture

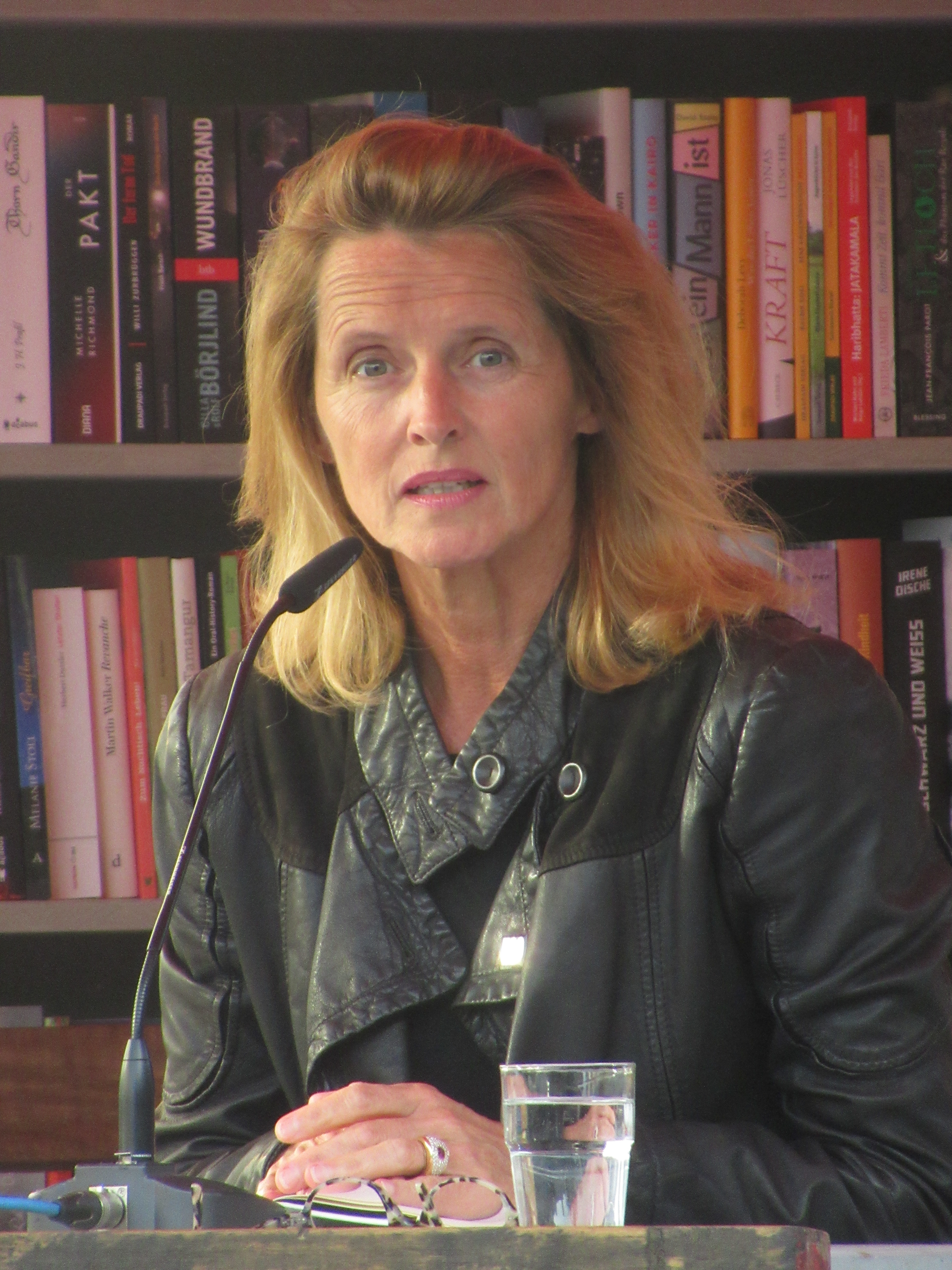
- Revedin in May 2019
- Born: Konstanz, Germany
- Education: Polytechnic University of Milan; Università Iuav di Venezia
- Occupations: Architect; scholar; professor
- Employer: École Spéciale d'Architecture

Jana Revedin is a German scholar, researcher, architect and professor thereof.

Born in Konstanz, Germany, Revedin has a degree from the Polytechnic University of Milan and a Doctor of Architecture from Università Iuav di Venezia. Having previously taught at Iuav, Umeå University, and the Blekinge Institute of Technology, as of June 2018, she was a professor at École Spéciale d'Architecture in Paris and a UNESCO delegate. She founded the Global Award for Sustainable Architecture in 2006, which has been awarded by UNESCO since 2011.
