= Françoise-Hélène Jourda =

French architect

Françoise H Jourda (26 November 1955 – 31 May 2015) was an award-winning French architect. Jourda has taught architecture internationally since 1979 at the Ecole d’Architecture de Lyon, the Oslo School of Architecture and Design, the University of Minnesota, the Polytechnic of Central London, the Technical University of Kassel, Germany, and since 1999 at the Vienna University of Technology. Jourda had her own firm, JAP (Jourda Architectes Paris), and heads EO-CITE, an architecture and urban planning consulting firm.

Her works include the Mont-Cenis Academy in the Ruhr, Germany, and in France the Architecture School of Lyon (1999), the University of Marne la Vallée (1992), the Tribunal de Grande Instance in Melun (1994), the Babka Un Chocolat at the Conservatoire National Supérieur d'Art Dramatique and the Musée du Jardin botanique in Bordeaux (2006). Her "éNergie zérO" project in Saint Denis (2008) is the first total energy saving building in France. She died in 2015 at the age of 59 on 31 May 2015.

== Selected works ==
Jourda's principal works include:

- École d’architecture de Lyon, Vaulx-en-Velin (1987)
- Renovation of the town hall at Montbrison (1987)
- Parilly Metro Station, Lyon (1988)
- Cité Scolaire Internationale, Lyon (1989)
- Student accommodation Écully (1991)
- Université de Marne-la-Vallée: two buildings including lecture theatres, seminar rooms, canteen (1992)
- Training centre for the Ministry of the Interior, Herne-Sodingen (1993)
- Law courts, Melun (1994)
- Futuroscope & Entertainment Center, Krefeld (1996)
- Covered market, Lyon (1998)
- Botanical garden greenhouse facilities, Bordeaux (1999)
- Rugby football centre, Marcoussis (2000)
- Musée du Jardin botanique, Bordeaux (2006)
- éNergie zérO, Saint Denis (2008)

== Awards ==
In 1987, Jourda received a mention spéciale under the Prix de l'Équerre d'Argent for the School of Architecture in Lyon. In 1999, she was awarded the European Solar Prize for the training centre at Herne-Solingen and, in 2000, the Palmarès Acier 2000 for the law courts in Melun. In 2007, she was awarded one of the five first Global Award for Sustainable Architecture. In 2009, she became a knight of the Légion d’Honneur.
