= Wellesley family =

British noble family

Wellesley Mac Bhalronta
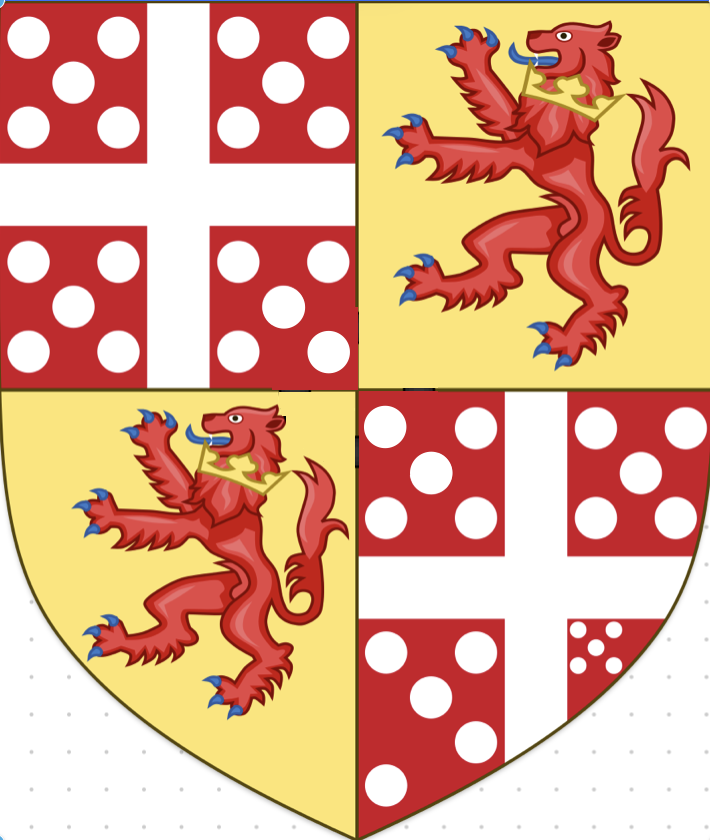
- Wellesley modern Arms: Quarterly: 1st & 4th, Gules, a Cross Argent, in each quarter five Plates saltirewise (Wellesley); 2nd & 3rd, Or, a Lion rampant Gules, ducally gorged Gold (Cowley)
- Parent house: House of Colley (since the mid 18th century)
- Country: Kingdom of Wessex; Kingdom of England; Lordship of Ireland; Kingdom of Ireland; Kingdom of Great Britain; United Kingdom; Kingdom of Portugal; Kingdom of Spain; Kingdom of Belgium; Kingdom of the Netherlands
- Origin: Wells, Somerset
- Founded: 938; 1088 years ago
- Current head: Charles Wellesley, 9th Duke of Wellington
- Seat: Stratfield Saye House
- Historic seat: Dangan Castle
- Titles: Duke of Wellington, Prince of Waterloo; Duke of Victoria; Duke of Ciudad Rodrigo; Marquess of Wellington; Marquess of Douro; Marquess of Torres Vedras; Marquess Wellesley; Earl of Mornington; Earl of Wellington; Earl Cowley; Count of Vimeiro; Viscount Wellesley of Dangan Castle; Viscount Wellington of Talavera; Viscount Dangan of Dangan; Baron Mornington; Baron Wellesley; Baron Maryborough; Baron Cowley; Baron Douro; Baron of Norragh; Baron of Carbury; Baron of Coolestown; Hereditary Standard Bearer of Ireland (Office); West Saxon Thegn
- Motto: Virtutis Fortuna Comes (Fortune is the companion of valour)
- Estates: Dangan Castle; Trim Castle; Carbury Castle, County Kildare; Stratfield Saye House; Apsley House; Mornington House; Wanstead House; Draycot House
- Cadet branches: House of Maryborough (extinct); House of Wellington (now senior branch); House of Cowley

The Wellesley family is an Anglo-Irish noble family of Anglo-Saxon heritage. The family was originally from Somerset, deriving its name from the City of Wells in that county, with which they had a close association. The family holds the office of Hereditary Royal Standard Bearer of Ireland, which they initially received through Grand Serjantcy. A Wellesley accompanied King Henry II of England to Ireland in 1172 as his standard bearer during the Hiberno-Norman Invasion and for this service received large grants of land in County Meath and Kildare.

It has been suggested that Guy, the first known Wellesley was made a thegn by King Athelstan in 938 and he is said to have resided near Wells in Somerset. Furthermore, the manor of Wellesley, located in Somerset, was expressly mentioned in a charter of Edward the Confessor to the Church of Wells in 1065. In the reign of Henry I, Avenant de Wellesley was King's serjeant of all the country lying east of the river Parret in Somersetshire.

According to Burke's Peerage, the Wellesley lineage can be directly traced to Waleran de Wellesley who became first itinerant justice of Ireland in 1255. It is generally accepted that he was the first member of the family to permanently settle in Ireland. A close descendant, Sir William de Wellesley was given custody of Kildare castle by Edward II and was summoned to Parliament in 1339, receiving the title of Baron Noragh. However, the Wellesley family became extinct in the male line with the death of Garret Wesley in 1728 so a royal licence was obtained, allowing the estates and arms to be inherited by a cousin Richard Colley. Richard descended from the Wellesley's family through female line, as is shown below.

- Waleran de Wellesley, Justice Itinerant (died 1276)
  - Waleran de Wellesley of Brianstown (died 1303)
    - Sir John de Wellesley, Sheriff of Kildare
      - Sir John de Wellesley (2)
        - Sir William de Wellesley, Lord Wellesley
          - Sir Richard de Wellesley, Sheriff of Kildare
            - William de Wellesley
            - Waleran Wellesley
            - Gerald Wellesley
            - James Wellesley of Newcastle Macormigan
              - Edward Wellesley
              - John Wellesley
                - John Wellesley
            - Christopher Wellesley of Dangan (died 1464)
              - Sir William Wellesley of Dangan (died 1502)
                - Gerald Wellesley of Dangan and Mornington
                  - William Wellesley of Dangan and Mornington
                    - Gerald Wellesley of Dangan and Mornington
                - Alison Wellesley
                  - Sir Thomas Cusack, Lord Chancellor of Ireland (1490-1571)
                    - Catherine Cusack (died 1597/98)
                      - Sir Henry Colley
                        - Sir Henry Colley M.P (died 1637)
                          - Dudley Colley M.P (1621-1674
                            - Henry Colley (died 1719)
                              - Richard Wesley, 1st Baron Mornington (1690-1758)
                                - Garret Wesley, 1st Earl of Mornington (1735-1781)
                                  - Richard Wellesley, 1st Marquess Wellesley (1760–1842)
                                  - William Wellesley-Pole, 3rd Earl of Mornington (1763–1845)
                                  - Arthur Wellesley, 1st Duke of Wellington, (1769–1852)
                                  - Gerald Wellesley (1770–1848)
                                  - Henry Wellesley, 1st Baron Cowley (1773–1847)
              - Edmund de Wellesley
    - William de Wellesley, Constable of Kildare Castle
      - Sir William de Wellesley, Lord of Norragh

== Arms of the Wellesley Family ==
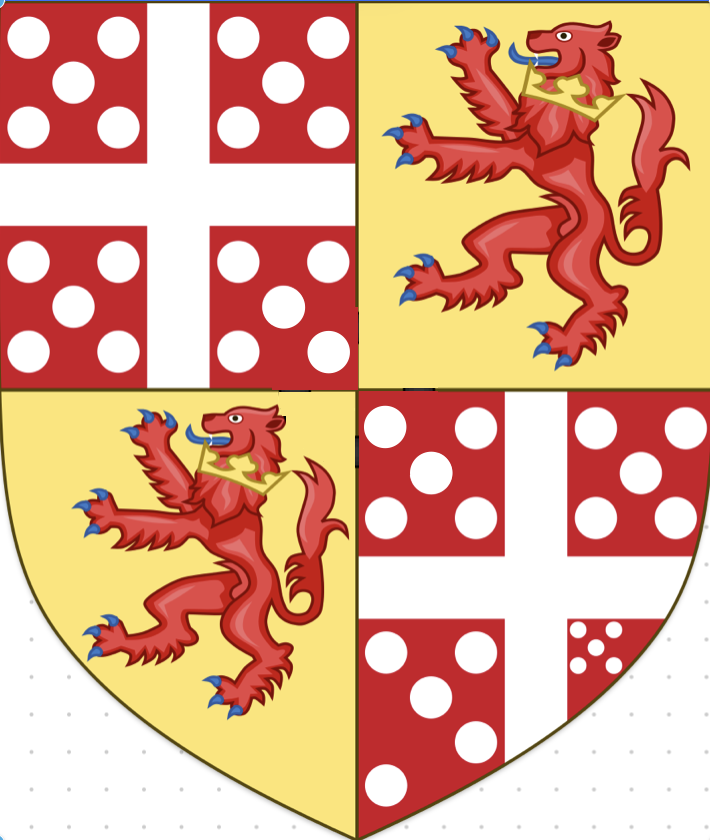
Arms of Garret Wesley, 1st Earl of Mornington

Personal arms of Arthur Wellesley, 1st Duke of Wellington.

Arms of the Dukes of Wellington

Arms of Henry Wellesley, 1st Baron Cowley

Arms of Richard Wellesley, 1st Marquess Wellesley

Arms of the Wellesley family before union with the Colley's

Ancient Arms of the Wellesley's of Dangan

Arms of the Colley/Cowley family, patrilineal ancestors of the modern Wellesley's.

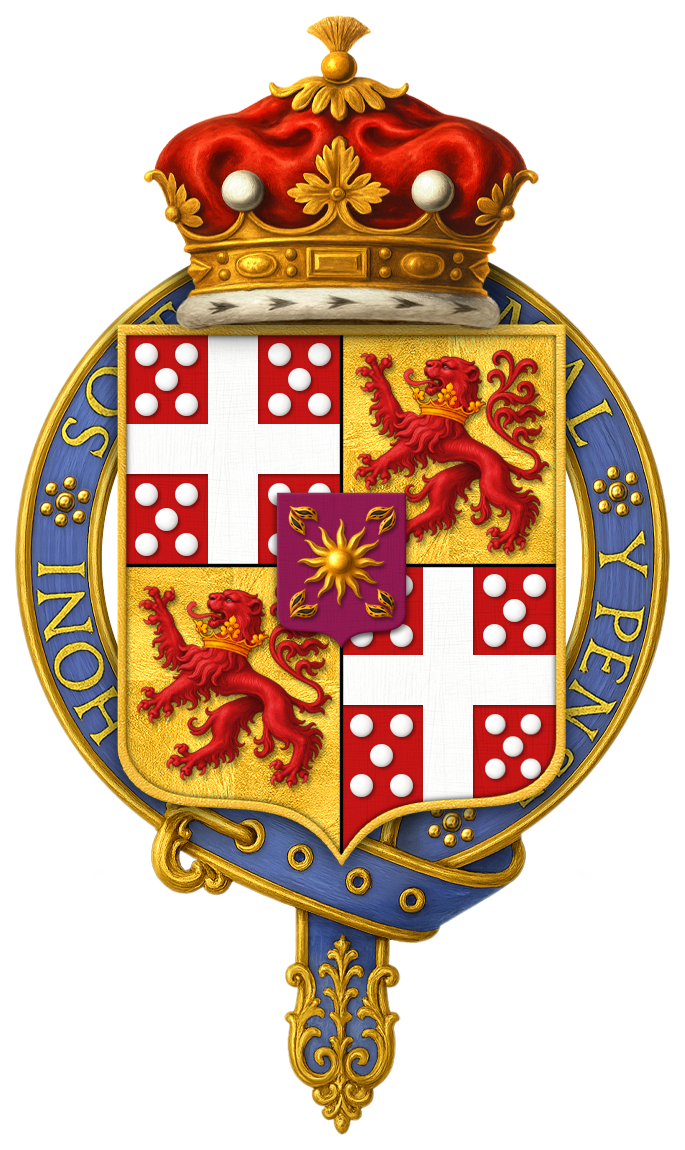
Arms of Richard Wellesley, 1st Marquess Wellesley, Knight of the Garter

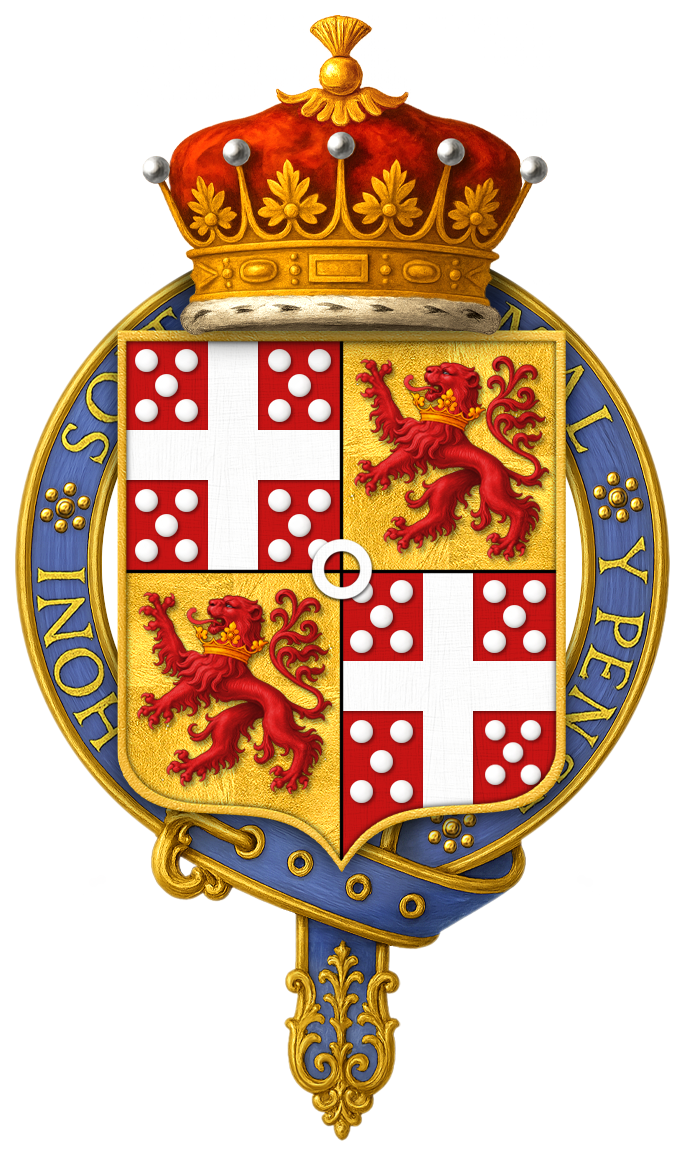
Arms of Henry Wellesley, 1st Earl Cowley, Knight of the Garter

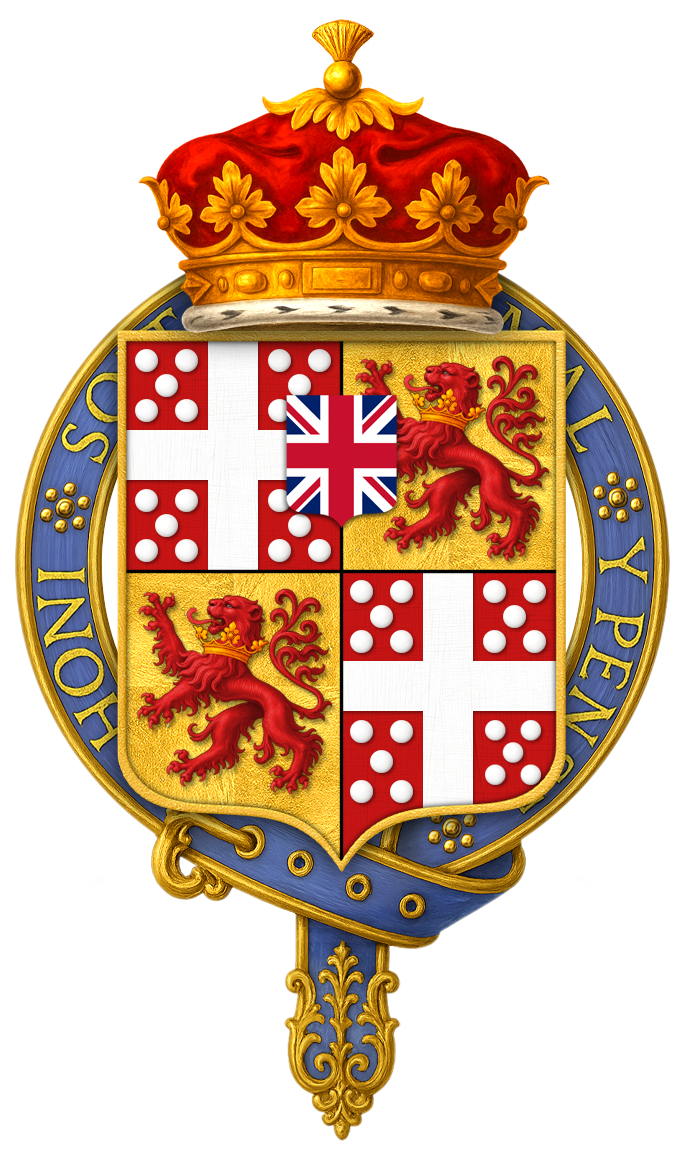
Arms of Arthur Wellesley, 1st Duke of Wellington, Knight of the Garter

Arthur Wellesley, 1st Duke of Wellington, Order of the Golden Fleece

Coat of arms of the Duke of Wellington

Coat of arms of the Duke of Ciudad Rodrigo

== Barons of Mornington ==
Richard Colley (as he was christened) was born around 1690, the son of Henry Colley (died 1719) and Mary, daughter of Sir William Ussher. Wesley had a notable younger brother: Henry Colley (died 1723). He graduated from Trinity College, Dublin with a BA in 1711 and an MA in 1714 as Richard Colley. In the intervening year he held the office of Chamberlain of the Court of Exchequer (Ireland).

On 23 September 1728 Colley inherited the estates of Dangan and Mornington, in County Meath, on the death of his cousin, Garret Wesley. (Note: In his Tour in Ireland (1752) Richard Pococke described Dangan Castle, Mornington's home, as follows: "We soon after came to Dangan the seat of Lord Mornington situated on a most beautiful flat, with an Amphitheater of hills rising round it, one over another, in a most beautiful manner; at the lower end is a very large piece of water, at one corner of which is an Island, it is a regular fortification, there is a ship a sloop and boats on the water, and a yard for building; the hill beyond it, is improved into a beautiful wilderness: on a round hill near the house is a Temple, and the hills round are adorned with obelisks: Pillars and some buildings, altogether the most beautiful thing I ever saw".(Pococke 2010, p. 235)) Less than two months later on 15 November 1728 he legally changed his surname to Wesley.

Between 1729 and 1746 Wesley represented Trim in the Irish House of Commons. He was High Sheriff of Meath in 1734 and he was created Baron Mornington in the Peerage of Ireland on 9 July 1746.

== Earls of Mornington ==
The first earl was the eldest son of Richard Wesley, the first Baron Mornington. Richard Wesley, born Richard Colley, was elevated to the Peerage of Ireland as Baron Mornington, of Mornington, in 1746. He had inherited the Dangan and Mornington estates in County Meath on the death of his first cousin Garret Wesley in 1728. In the same year he was granted by Royal licence the new surname of Wesley (see below for earlier history of the family).

His son, the second Baron, was made the first Earl of Mornington in 1760, and at the same time also became Viscount Wellesley, of Dangan Castle in the County of Meath, also in the Peerage of Ireland.

Four of the first earl's sons gained distinction. The third son was Arthur Wellesley, 1st Duke of Wellington, who defeated Napoleon Bonaparte at the Battle of Waterloo in 1815 (see Duke of Wellington), while the fifth was the diplomat Henry Wellesley, 1st Baron Cowley (see Earl Cowley).

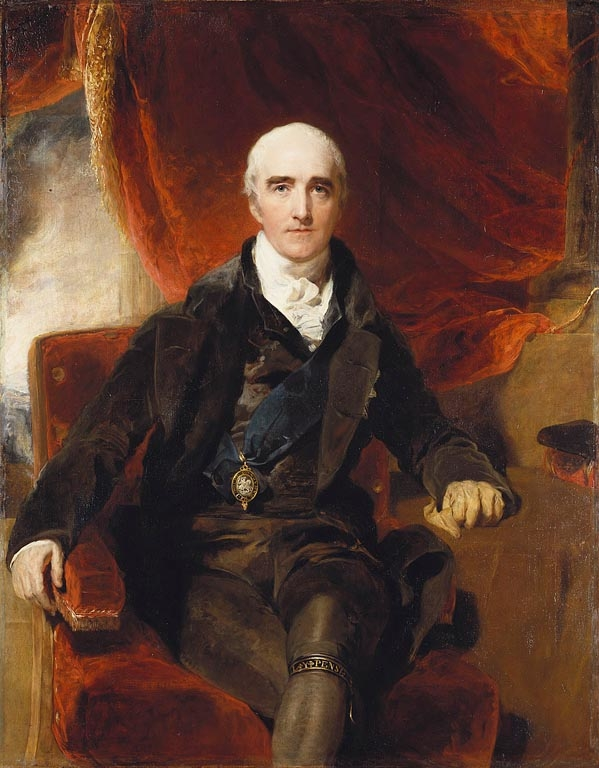
Portrait of the Marquess Wellesley by Thomas Lawrence, 1813

The first earl was succeeded by his eldest son, Richard, the second earl. He used the original family surname of Wellesley in lieu of Wesley. He was a prominent soldier, diplomat and politician. In 1797 he was created Baron Wellesley, of Wellesley in the County of Somerset, in the Peerage of Great Britain, which entitled him to a seat in the British House of Lords. In 1799 he was further honoured when he was made Marquess Wellesley, of Norragh, in the Peerage of Ireland. However, he was said to be bitterly disappointed at not receiving a dukedom or at least an English peerage of high rank. He referred to his Irish marquessate as a "double-gilt potato". Lord Wellesley had several children by his French mistress, Hyacinthe-Gabrielle Roland (they were married in 1794 after the birth of their children). One of them, Anne, married as her second husband Lord Charles Bentinck. They were great-great-grandparents of Queen Elizabeth II.

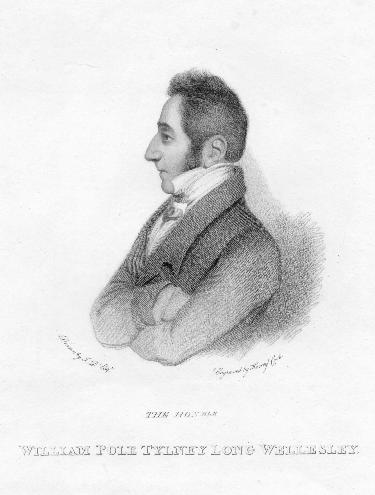
William Pole-Tylney-Long-Wellesley, 4th Earl of Mornington

As Lord Wellesley had no legitimate children, the English barony of 1797 and the marquessate became extinct on his death in 1842. He was succeeded in the other titles by his younger brother William Wellesley-Pole, 1st Baron Maryborough, who became the third Earl of Mornington. He was also a politician and notably served as Chief Secretary for Ireland between 1809 and 1812 and as Chancellor of the Irish Exchequer between 1811 and 1812. Born William Wesley, he assumed by Royal licence in 1781 the additional surname of Pole on succeeding to the estates of his cousin, William Pole. In 1798 he assumed by Royal licence the surname of Wellesley-Pole in lieu of Wesley-Pole. In 1821 he was raised to the Peerage of the United Kingdom as Baron Maryborough, of Maryborough in the Queen's County. He was succeeded by his son, the fourth Earl. He married Catherine, daughter and coheir of Sir James Tylney-Long, 7th Baronet (see Tylney-Long Baronets). She was known in London society as "The Wiltshire heiress" and was believed to be the richest commoner in England. On his marriage he assumed by Royal licence the additional surnames of Tylney and Long.

Lord Mornington is chiefly remembered for his dissipated lifestyle which brought about the destruction of the Tylney family estate of Wanstead House. He was succeeded by his eldest and only surviving son, the fifth Earl. He had been the subject of a bitter custody battle between his father and his two maternal aunts (who had wanted him to be placed under the guardianship of his great-uncle the Duke of Wellington) and later fought a legal battle with his father over the sale of contents of the family seat Draycot House. Lord Mornington died unmarried in 1863 when the barony of Maryborough became extinct. He left all his landed property to his father's cousin Henry Wellesley, 1st Earl Cowley. He was succeeded in his Irish titles by his first cousin once removed, Arthur Wellesley, 2nd Duke of Wellington. The title Earl of Mornington is now used as a courtesy title by the heir apparent to the Marquess of Douro, himself the heir apparent to the Duke of Wellington. As of 2015, the title is held by courtesy by Arthur Wellesley, Earl of Mornington, son of Arthur Wellesley, Marquess of Douro and grandson of Charles Wellesley, 9th Duke of Wellington.

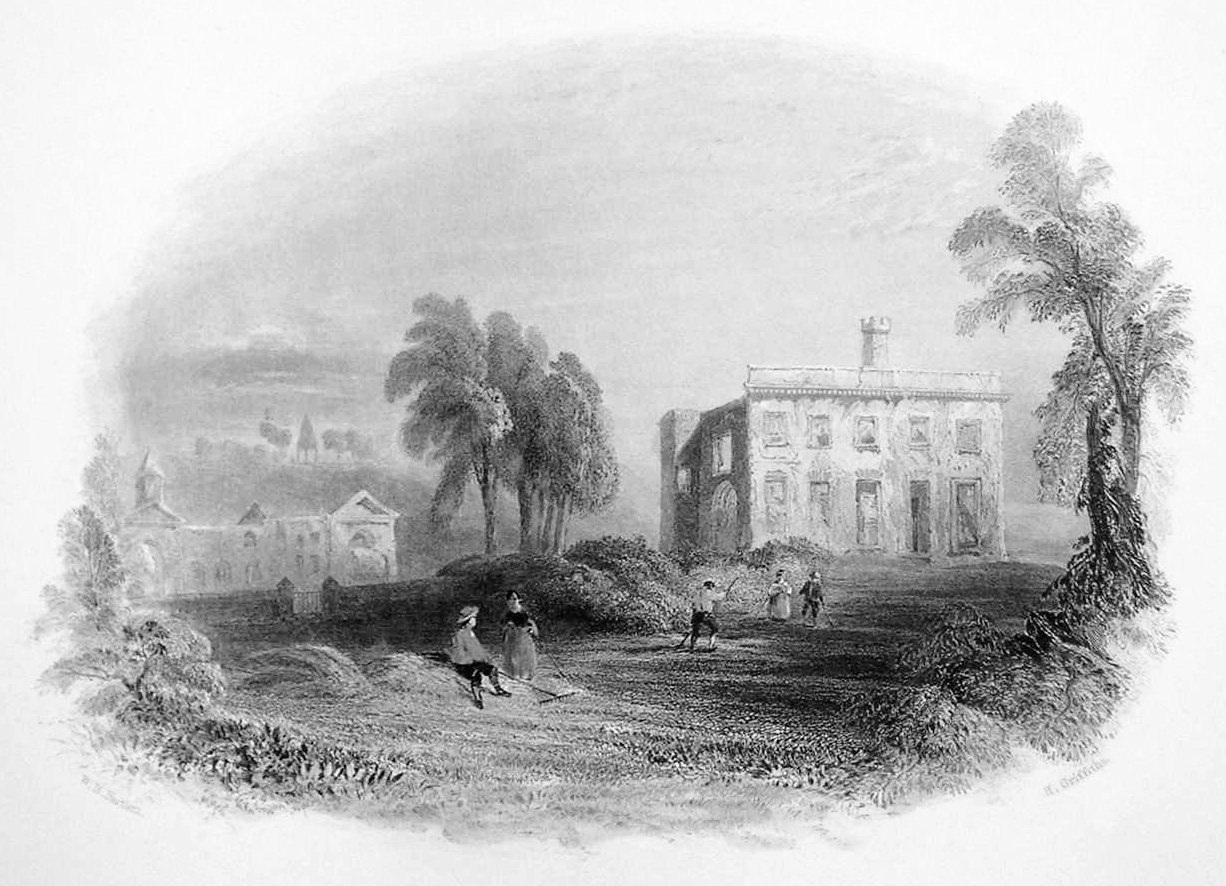
Dangan Castle, c. 1840

The Wesley or Wellesley family descended from Sir Richard de Wellesley (15th century). His grandson Sir William Wellesley (died 1602) lived at Dangan Castle, County Meath. The family estates passed down the male lines. One of Wellesley's daughters, Alison, married John Cusack. Their son Sir Thomas Cusack served as Lord Chancellor of Ireland between 1551 and 1554. His daughter, Katherine, married Sir Henry Colley (or Cowley) (16th century), of Castle Carbery, County Kildare. Their grandson Sir Henry Colley represented County Monaghan in the Irish Parliament. One of Sir Henry's sons, Dudley Colley (or Cowley), was a member of the Irish Parliament for Philipstown. His son Henry Colley (or Cowley) was the father of Henry Cowley, who represented Strabane in the Irish House of Commons, and of Garret Wesley, 1st Baron Mornington. The aforementioned Garret Wesley (died 1728) was a descendant of Sir William Wellesley (died 1602) as well as the son of Elizabeth, daughter of the aforementioned Dudley Colley, also the paternal grandfather of the first Baron Mornington.

The country seat of the Wellesley family was Dangan Castle, near Summerhill, County Meath. The Dublin residence of the family was Mornington House, Merrion Street.

- Richard Wesley, 1st Baron Mornington (1690–1758)
  - Garret Wesley, 1st Earl of Mornington (1735–1781)
    - Richard Wellesley, 1st Marquess Wellesley (1760–1842)
    - William Wellesley-Pole, 3rd Earl of Mornington (1763–1845)
      - William Pole-Tylney-Long-Wellesley, 4th Earl of Mornington (1788–1857)
        - William Pole-Tylney-Long-Wellesley, 5th Earl of Mornington (1813–1863)
        - The Hon. James Pole-Tylney-Long-Wellesley (1815–1851)
    - Arthur Wellesley, 1st Duke of Wellington, (1769–1852)
      - Arthur Wellesley, 2nd Duke of Wellington, 6th Earl of Mornington (1807–1884)
      - Lord Charles Wellesley (1808–1858)
        - Henry Wellesley, 3rd Duke of Wellington, 7th Earl of Mornington (1846–1900)
        - Arthur Wellesley, 4th Duke of Wellington, 8th Earl of Mornington (1849–1934)
          - Arthur Wellesley, 5th Duke of Wellington, 9th Earl of Mornington (1876–1941)
            - Henry Wellesley, 6th Duke of Wellington, 10th Earl of Mornington (1912–1943)
          - Gerald Wellesley, 7th Duke of Wellington, 11th Earl of Mornington (1885–1972)
            - Valerian Wellesley, 8th Duke of Wellington, 12th Earl of Mornington (1915–2014)
              - Charles Wellesley, 9th Duke of Wellington, 13th Earl of Mornington (b. 1945)
                - (1) Arthur Wellesley, Earl of Mornington (b. 1978)
                  - (2) Arthur Wellesley, Viscount Wellesley (b. 2010)
                  - (3) Hon. Alfred Wellesley (b. 2014)
                - (4) Lord Frederick Wellesley (b. 1992)
              - (5) Lord Richard Wellesley (b. 1949)
              - (6) Lord John Wellesley (b. 1954)
                - (7) Gerald Wellesley (b. 1981)
              - (8) Lord James Wellesley (b. 1956)
                - (9) Oliver Wellesley (b. 2005)
          - Lord George Wellesley (1889–1967)
            - Richard Wellesley (1920–1984)
              - John Wellesley (1962–2009)
                - (10) Thomas Wellesley (b. 2000)
    - Gerald Wellesley (1770–1848)
      - Arthur Richard Wellesley (1804–1830)
      - William Wellesley (1813–1888)
        - Arthur Wellesley (1850–1893)
          - Garret Wellesley (1880–1915)
        - Gerald Wellesley (1852–1914)
          - Cyril Wellesley (1879–1915)
          - Frederick Wellesley (1880–1955)
            - Frederic Wellesley (1908–1978)
        - Edmond Wellesley (1858–1886)
          - Gerald Wellesley (1885–1933)
            - Edmund Wellesley (1919–1944)
            - Philip Wellesley (1921–1992)
          - Edmond Wellesley (1886–1916)
        - Herbert Wellesley (1867–1905)
          - Ronald Wellesley (1894–1914)
          - Eric Wellesley (1896–1915)
      - George Wellesley (1814–1901)
    - Henry Wellesley, 1st Baron Cowley (1773–1847)
      - Henry Wellesley, 1st Earl Cowley (1804–1884)
        - William Wellesley, 2nd Earl Cowley (1834–1895)
          - Henry Wellesley, 3rd Earl Cowley (1866–1919)
            - Arthur Wellesley, 4th Earl Cowley (1890–1962)
              - Denis Wellesley, 5th Earl Cowley (1921–1968)
                - Richard Wellesley, 6th Earl Cowley (1946–1975)
              - Garret Wellesley, 7th Earl Cowley (1934–2016)
                - (11) Graham Wellesley, 8th Earl Cowley (born 1965)
                  - (12) Henry Wellesley, Viscount Dangan (born 1991)
                  - (13) Hon. Bertram Wellesley (born 1999)
              - (14) Hon. Brian Wellesley (born 1938)
            - Hon. Henry Wellesley (1907–1981)
              - (15) Henry Wellesley (born 1970)
                - (16) Jay Wellesley (born 2001)
              - (17) Richard Wellesley (born 1972)
      - Hon. Captain William Wellesley (1806–1875)
        - Gerald Edward Wellesley (1846–1915)
          - Gerald Valerian Wellesley (1885–1961)
            - Julian Valerian Wellesley (1933–1996)
              - (18) William Valerian Wellesley (born 1966)
                - (19) Julian Valerian Arthur Wellesley (born 1997)
                - (20) George Edward Valerian Wellesley (born 2007)
      - Hon. Gerald Valerian Wellesley (1809–1882)
        - Albert Wellesley (?–?)

== Earls Cowley ==
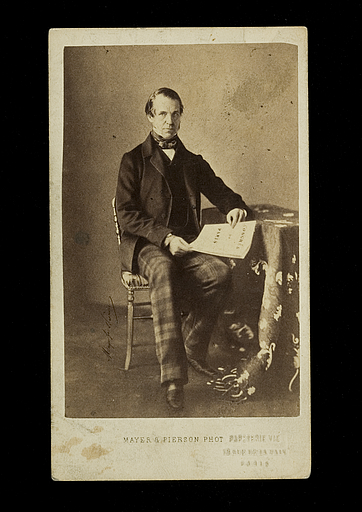
Henry Wellesley, 1st Earl Cowley

Earl Cowley is a title in the Peerage of the United Kingdom. It was created in 1857 for the diplomat Henry Wellesley, 2nd Baron Cowley. He was Ambassador to France from 1852 to 1867. He was made Viscount Dangan, of Dangan in the County of Meath, at the same time as he was given the earldom. This title is also in the Peerage of the United Kingdom. Lord Cowley was the eldest son of Henry Wellesley, 1st Baron Cowley, who like his son served as Ambassador to France. In 1828 he was created Baron Cowley, of Wellesley in the County of Somerset, in the Peerage of the United Kingdom. A member of the prominent Wellesley family, Cowley was the fifth and youngest son of Garret Wellesley, 1st Earl of Mornington, and the younger brother of Arthur Wellesley, 1st Duke of Wellington, and Richard Wellesley, 1st Marquess Wellesley.

The first Earl was succeeded by his eldest son, the second Earl. He was a Lieutenant-Colonel in the Coldstream Guards and fought in the Crimean War. His great-great-grandson (the titles having descended from father to son), the sixth Earl, served as a Lord-in-waiting (government whip in the House of Lords) from January to March 1974 in the Conservative government of Edward Heath. He was succeeded in 1975 by his uncle, the seventh Earl, who was the eldest son from the fourth Earl's second marriage and the half-brother of the fifth Earl. As of 2017, the titles are held by the latter's son, the eighth Earl, who succeeded in 2016. As a male-line descendant of the first Earl of Mornington, he is also in remainder to this peerage and its subsidiary titles, which are now held by his kinsman, the 9th Duke of Wellington.

- Henry Wellesley, 1st Baron Cowley (1773–1847)
  - Henry Wellesley, 1st Earl Cowley (1804–1884)
    - William Wellesley, 2nd Earl Cowley (1834–1895)
      - Henry Wellesley, 3rd Earl Cowley (1866–1919)
        - Arthur Wellesley, 4th Earl Cowley (1890–1962)
          - Denis Wellesley, 5th Earl Cowley (1921–1968)
            - Richard Wellesley, 6th Earl Cowley (1946–1975)
          - Garret Wellesley, 7th Earl Cowley (1934–2016)
            - Graham Wellesley, 8th Earl Cowley (born 1965)
              - (1) Henry Wellesley, Viscount Dangan (born 1991)
              - (2) Hon. Bertram Wellesley (born 1999)
          - Hon. Brian Wellesley (1938-2026)
        - Hon. Henry Wellesley (1907–1981)
          - (3) Henry Wellesley (born 1970)
            - (4) Jay Wellesley (born 2001)
          - (5) Richard Wellesley (born 1972)
  - Hon. William Wellesley (1806–1875)
    - Gerald Edward Wellesley (1846–1915)
      - Gerald Valerian Wellesley (1885–1961)
        - Julian Valerian Wellesley (1933–1996)
          - (6) William Valerian Wellesley (born 1966)
            - (7) Julian Valerian Arthur Wellesley (born 1997)
            - (8) George Edward Valerian Wellesley (born 2007)
  - Hon. Gerald Valerian Wellesley (1809–1882)
    - Albert Wellesley (?–?)

== Dukes of Wellington ==
The titles of Duke of Wellington and Marquess of Douro were bestowed upon Arthur Wellesley, 1st Marquess of Wellington, on 3 May 1814 after he returned home a hero following Napoleon's abdication. He fought some sixty battles during his military career. He was considered "the conqueror of Napoleon". He stands as one of the finest soldiers that Great Britain and Ireland has ever produced, others being the 1st Duke of Marlborough and the 2nd Duke of Argyll.

Following his victory at the Battle of Talavera, Wellesley was offered a peerage. The question was what title should he take. His brother, Richard Wellesley, Earl of Mornington, looked around and discovered that a manor in the parish of Wellington, Somerset, was available. It was also reasonably close to the family name. Because Arthur was still in Spain in command of the army fighting the French, Richard oversaw the purchase. By this process Arthur therefore became Marquess of Wellington. According to the book Wellington as Military Commander by Michael Glover, Arthur Wellesley first signed himself 'Wellington' on 16 September 1809. At the Battle of Waterloo in 1815, Arthur Wellesley was already further elevated to the peerage rank of the Duke of Wellington. At the time he became Ambassador to France, The London Gazette of 4 June 1814 refers to him as having that title but suggests that it was granted by warrant on 25 August 1812.

=== Subsidiary titles ===
The subsidiary titles of the Duke of Wellington are Marquess of Wellington (1812), Marquess of Douro (1814), Earl of Mornington (1760 – but only inherited by the Dukes of Wellington in 1863), Earl of Wellington (1812), Viscount Wellesley (1760 – inherited in 1863), Viscount Wellington (1809), Baron Mornington (1746 – also inherited in 1863), and Baron Douro (1809). The Viscountcy of Wellesley and the Barony and Earldom of Mornington are in the Peerage of Ireland; the rest are in the Peerage of the United Kingdom.

=== European titles and honours ===
Apart from the British titles, the Dukes of Wellington also hold the titles of Prince of Waterloo (Prins van Waterloo, 1815) of the Kingdom of the Netherlands, Duke of Ciudad Rodrigo (Duque de Ciudad Rodrigo, 1812) of the Kingdom of Spain with Grandeeship, and Duke of Victoria (Duque da Vitória, 1812), with the subsidiary titles Marquess of Torres Vedras (Marquês de Torres Vedras, 1812) and Count of Vimeiro (Conde de Vimeiro, 1811) of the Kingdom of Portugal. These were granted to the first Duke as victory titles for his distinguished service as victorious commanding general in the Peninsular War (in Spain and Portugal) and at the Battle of Waterloo (in what is now Belgium).

== Prominent members ==
- Waleran de Wellesley
- Richard Wesley, 1st Baron Mornington
- Henry Wellesley, 1st Baron Cowley
- Arthur Wellesley, 1st Duke of Wellington
- Richard Wellesley, 1st Marquess Wellesley

== Bibliography ==
- Cokayne, G.E. (2000), The Complete Peerage of England, Scotland, Ireland, Great Britain and the United Kingdom, Extant, Extinct or Dormant, vol. IX (new, reprint in 6 volumes ed.), Gloucester, U.K.: Alan Sutton Publishing, p. 235
- Pococke, Richard (2010) [1752], Pococke's Tour in Ireland in 1752 (Stoke's 1891 ed.), Cork: Corpus of Electronic Texts (CELT): a project of University College
