= Wellesley =

Wellesley may refer to:

== People ==
=== Dukes of Wellington ===
- Arthur Wellesley, 1st Duke of Wellington (1769–1852), British soldier, statesman, and Prime Minister of the United Kingdom
- Arthur Wellesley, 2nd Duke of Wellington (1807–1884), British politician
- Henry Wellesley, 3rd Duke of Wellington (1846–1900), British soldier and politician
- Arthur Wellesley, 4th Duke of Wellington (1849–1934), British soldier
- Arthur Wellesley, 5th Duke of Wellington (1876–1941), British soldier
- Henry Wellesley, 6th Duke of Wellington (1912–1943), British soldier
- Gerald Wellesley, 7th Duke of Wellington (1885–1972), British soldier and diplomat
- Valerian Wellesley, 8th Duke of Wellington (1915–2014), British soldier
- Charles Wellesley, 9th Duke of Wellington (born 1945), British politician and a businessman

=== Barons Cowley (1828) ===
- Henry Wellesley, 1st Baron Cowley (1773–1847)
- Henry Richard Charles Wellesley, 2nd Baron Cowley (1804–1884) (created Earl Cowley in 1857)

=== Earls Cowley (1857) ===
- Henry Richard Charles Wellesley, 1st Earl Cowley (1804–1884)
- William Henry Wellesley, 2nd Earl Cowley (1834–1895)
- Henry Arthur Mornington Wellesley, 3rd Earl Cowley (1866–1919)
- Christian Arthur Wellesley, 4th Earl Cowley (1890–1962)
- Denis Arthur Wellesley, 5th Earl Cowley (1921–1968)
- Richard Francis Wellesley, 6th Earl Cowley (1946–1975)
- Garret Graham Wellesley, 7th Earl Cowley (1934–2016)
- Garret Graham Wellesley, 8th Earl Cowley (born 30 March 1965), styled Viscount Dangan from 1975 to 2016

The heir apparent is the present holder's son Henry Arthur Peter Wellesley, Viscount Dangan (b. 1991).

=== Others, including relatives of Dukes ===
- Arthur Wellesley, Marquess of Douro (born 1978), British businessman
- Lord Charles Wellesley (1808–1858), British politician
- Charles Wellesley (1873–1946), American actor
- Lady Charlotte Wellesley (born 1990), British producer and socialite
- Elizabeth Wellesley, Duchess of Wellington (1820–1904), Mistress of the Robes
- Lady Elizabeth Wellesley (1918–2013), British socialite
- Lord George Wellesley (1889–1967), British soldier
- Gerald Valerian Wellesley (1770–1848), Irish clergyman
- Lady Jane Wellesley (born 1951), British writer and television producer
- Richard Wellesley, 1st Marquess Wellesley (1760–1842), Irish peer, statesman, and Governor-General of India
- Walter Wellesley (c. 1470–1539), prior of Great Connell priory and bishop of Kildare
- Wellesley Wilson Staples, Canadian politician from Ontario

== Places and institutions ==
=== Australia ===
- Wellesley, Queensland, a locality in the Maranoa Region
- Wellesley Islands, an island group in the Gulf of Carpentaria, Queensland, and locality in the Shire of Mornington
  - South Wellesley Islands, an island group in the Gulf of Carpentaria, Queensland, and locality in the Shire of Mornington
  - West Wellesley Islands, an island group in the Gulf of Carpentaria, Queensland, and locality in the Shire of Mornington
- Wellesley, Western Australia, a locality in the Shire of Harvey

=== Canada ===
- Wellesley, Ontario, Canada, a township
- Wellesley (TTC), a subway station in Toronto, Ontario

=== Malaysia ===
- Province Wellesley, Penang, Malaysia, known in Malay as Seberang Prai

=== New Zealand ===
- Wellesley College, New Zealand, private boys-only independent primary school in New Zealand

=== United States ===
- Wellesley, Massachusetts, United States
  - Wellesley College, private women's liberal arts college in Wellesley, Massachusetts
  - Wellesley High School, public high school in Wellesley, Massachusetts

== Ships ==
- HMS Wellesley, name of two Royal Navy ships

== Other uses ==
- Wellesley & Co., Founded in November 2013, Wellesley provides asset-backed loans secured on residential property.
- The Vickers Wellesley, 1930s single-engine medium bomber of the Royal Air Force
- Wellesley marriage, defunct term for (not necessarily sexual) same-sex cohabitation, see Boston marriage
- The Wellesley (hotel), Knightsbridge, London
