= Duke of Wellington (disambiguation) =

The Duke of Wellington (1769–1852) was a British general who fought in the Napoleonic Wars and defeated Napoleon at Waterloo.

Duke of Wellington may also refer to:

- Duke of Wellington (title), a British peerage hereditary title
- Charles Wellesley, 9th Duke of Wellington, the current holder of the dukedom

== Buildings ==
- The Duke of Wellington, Marylebone, a pub in London, UK
- Duke of Wellington, Belgravia, a pub in London, UK
- Duke of Wellington, Bethnal Green, a former pub in London, UK
- Duke of Wellington Hotel, Melbourne, a hotel in Victoria, Australia

== Military ==
- HMS Duke of Wellington (1852), a 131-gun first-rate ship of the line of the Royal Navy
- TSS Duke of York (1935), a steamer renamed Duke of Wellington
- Duke of Wellington's Regiment, a former British Army regiment

== Other uses ==
- Portrait of the Duke of Wellington or Duke of Wellington

== See also ==
- Arthur Wellesley (disambiguation)
- Duke (disambiguation)
- Iron Duke (disambiguation)
- List of monuments to Arthur Wellesley, 1st Duke of Wellington, including many named "Duke of Wellington"
- Wellington (disambiguation)
