= Arthur Wellesley =

Arthur Wellesley may refer to:

- Arthur Wellesley, 1st Duke of Wellington (1769–1852), British Army officer and statesman
- Arthur Wellesley, 2nd Duke of Wellington (1807–1884), British Army officer
- Arthur Wellesley, 4th Duke of Wellington (1849–1934), British Army officer
- Arthur Wellesley, 5th Duke of Wellington (1876–1941), British Army officer
- Arthur Wellesley, Marquess of Douro (born 1978), grandson of the 8th Duke
- Arthur Wellesley Hughes (1870–1950), also known as Arthur Wellesley, Canadian musician and composer
- Arthur Wellesley, 4th Earl Cowley (1890–1962), British actor and nobleman

== See also ==
- Arthur (disambiguation)
- Wellesley (disambiguation)
- Duke of Wellington (disambiguation)
