= Richard Wellesley =

Richard Wellesley may refer to:

- Richard Wellesley, 1st Marquess Wellesley (1760–1842), Anglo-Irish politician and colonial administrator
- Richard Wellesley (1787–1831), his son, Anglo-Irish Member of Parliament
- Richard Wellesley, 6th Earl Cowley (1946–1975), British Conservative politician
