= Eaton Terrace =

Street in Belgravia, London

Coordinates: 51°29′34″N 0°09′11″W

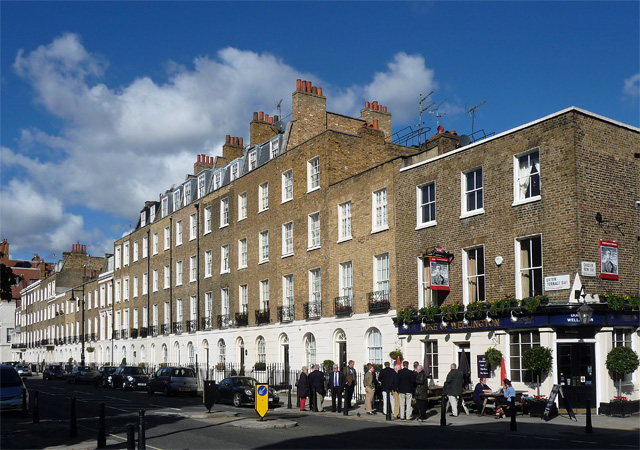
25-63 Eaton Terrace in 2012

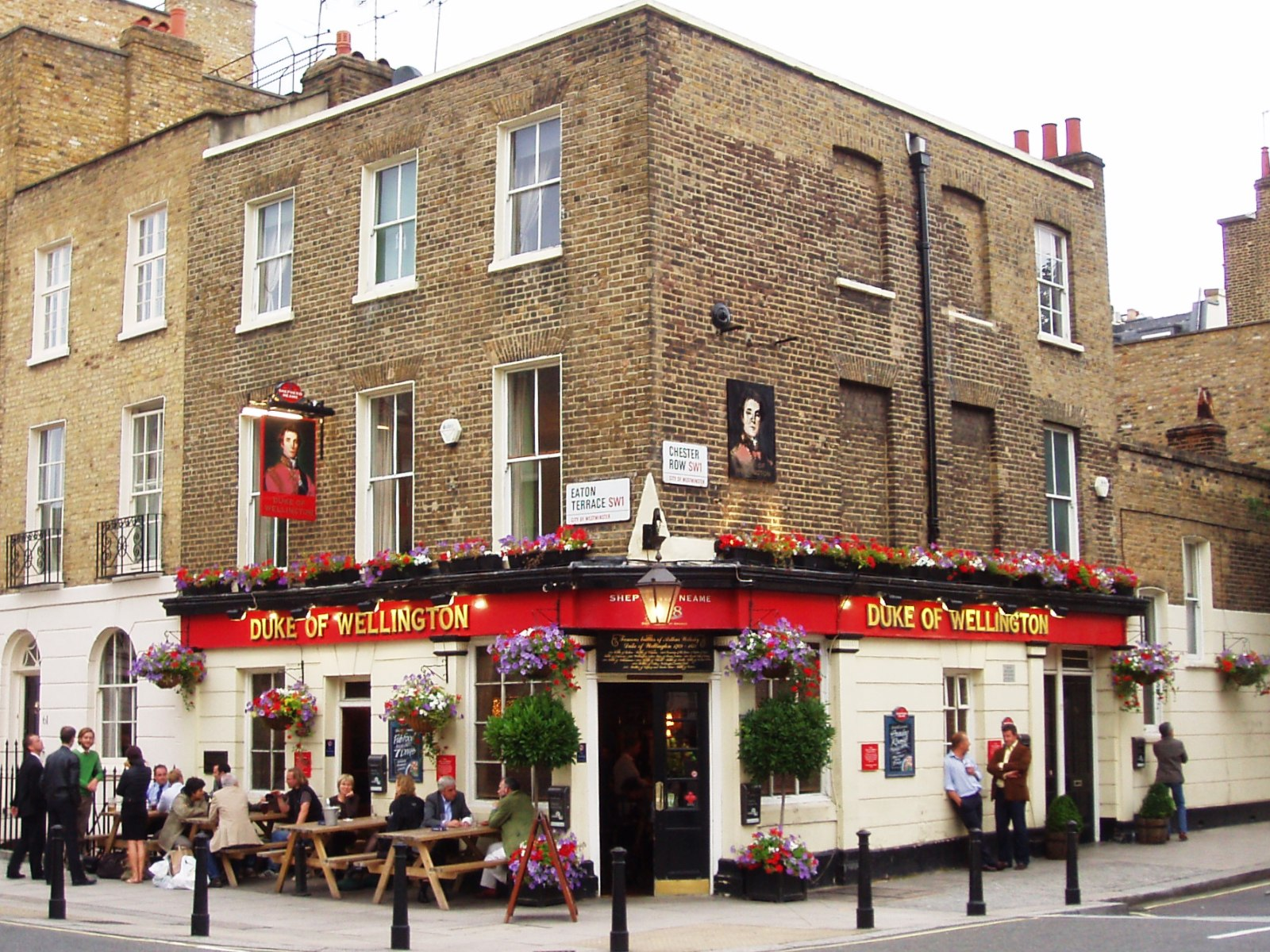
The Duke of Wellington Public House in 2008

Eaton Terrace is a street in Belgravia, central London. It is named after Eaton Hall which is the country seat of the Duke of Westminster who developed this district of London.

== Overview ==
Eaton Terrace runs roughly north-west to south-east from West Eaton Place and Eaton Square to Ebury Square.

The Duke of Wellington is a public house, which is located at 63 Eaton Terrace. It was built in the early 19th century and is a Grade II listed building.

== Notable residents ==
- Antony Armstrong-Jones, 1st Earl of Snowdon, who married Princess Margaret was born in Eaton Terrace during 1930.
- Michelle Mone and her husband, Douglas Barrowman, own a house in Eaton Terrace, which was listed for sale in December 2022.
- Bertram Fletcher Robinson, who was a sportsman, journalist, editor, author and Liberal Unionist Party campaigner, died at 44 Eaton Terrace on 21 January 1907.
