= Graham Wellesley, 8th Earl Cowley =

British hereditary peer and businessman (born 1965)

The Right Honourable The Earl Cowley
- Born: Garret Graham Wellesley; 30 March 1965 (age 61)
- Education: Franklin College, Switzerland
- Occupation: Businessperson
- Children: 3
- Parent(s): Garret Wellesley, 7th Earl Cowley; Suzanne Lennon

Garret Graham Wellesley, 8th Earl of Cowley (born 30 March 1965), styled Viscount Dangan from 1975 to 2016, is a British hereditary peer and businessman. Previously an entrepreneur in derivatives and foreign exchange trading, he was the founder and CEO of UK alternative lender Wellesley_&_Co. (now in administration).

== Early life ==
Graham Wellesley was born in 1965, the son of Garret Wellesley, 7th Earl Cowley, and his first wife, (Elizabeth) Suzanne Lennon. He has an elder sister, Lady Tara (born 1962). He is a descendant of Henry Wellesley, 1st Baron Cowley, brother of the Duke of Wellington. He spent his early years in California before coming to the UK aged 10, where he attended the American Community School in Hillingdon, west London.

After graduating with a degree in economics from Franklin College, Switzerland, he served for 18 months in the Household Cavalry.

== Career ==
Wellesley’s financial career began in 1985 as a derivatives trader at the London stockbroking firm Hoare Govett, from where he moved to two further derivatives trading roles at Banque Indosuez and ING Charterhouse. In 1992, he became head of foreign exchange trading at global metals trader Gerald Metals.

In 1995, he established the UK foreign exchange market maker IFX, which specialised in contracts for difference (CFDs) and spread bets on equity prices. In 1999, he and another director, Lorenzo Naldini, purchased the 51% of the business owned by its US parent company IFX Corp in a buyout that left them as sole shareholders.

In 2000, IFX was bought by the football pools operator Zetters for £20.4million in a reverse takeover, forming a new entity – IFX Group – with Wellesley as group chief executive. Two years later the company sold its pools business.

In 2003, Wellesley and Naldini left IFX following a disagreement with the board and co-founded ODL Securities, an online foreign exchange and derivatives broker.

In 2005, ODL was the whistleblower in an attempted banking fraud by US hedge fund Bayou. Bayou opened an account with ODL, depositing $101million and requesting two transactions that were refused by the management, who notified the UK Financial Services Authority.

In 2010, Wellesley and Naldini sold their 50% stake in ODL to US foreign exchange firm FXCM Holdings, creating a business employing around 1,000 staff. In December that year, the newly enlarged entity floated on the New York Stock Exchange.

In 2013, Graham Wellesley co-founded alternative lender Wellesley & Co. with three other shareholders, taking the role of chief executive. The following year the company issued what at the time was the largest ever loan by a peer-to-peer lender – a £8.3million bridging loan to a UK urban regeneration scheme. In September 2020 the company engaged Duff & Phelps to draw up a company voluntary arrangement (CVA) to try to avoid what they described as a "disorderly wind-down and likely insolvency which would result in an inferior outcome for all investors". If the CVA is agreed by the creditors, unsecured bondholders may get 1p per £1 invested whilst secured investors may get up to 84p per £1; if not the firm will go into administration. The firm went into administration on 30th April 2025.

Related to the collapse of Wellesley & Co, in April 2024 Graham Wellesley lost a High Court battle about a loan secured against Chalet Valentine, their six-bedroom, five-bathroom property on the Mont d’Arbois in France, close to the Swiss border.

== Personal life ==
In 1990, Wellesley married Claire L. Brighton. The couple have two sons and a daughter:

- Henry Arthur Peter Wellesley, Viscount Dangan (born 3 December 1991)
- Lady Natasha Rose Wellesley (born 28 June 1994)
- Hon. Bertram Garret Graham Bertie Wellesley (born 12 April 1999)

== See also ==
Charles Wellesley, 9th Duke of Wellington

== Ancestry ==
Ancestors of Graham Wellesley, 8th Earl Cowley

16. William Wellesley, 2nd Earl Cowley (1834–1895)
8. Henry Wellesley, 3rd Earl Cowley (1866–1919)
17. Emily Williams (1839–1932)
4. Christian Wellesley, 4th Earl Cowley (1890–1962)
18. William Nevill, 1st Marquess of Abergavenny (1826–1915)
9. Lady Violet Nevill (1866–1910)
19. Caroline Vanden-Bempde-Johnstone (1826–1892)
2. Garret Wellesley, 7th Earl Cowley (1934–2016)
5. Mary Elsie Himes
1. Graham Wellesley, 8th Earl Cowley
6. Hayes Lennon
3. Suzanne Lennon

Peerage of the United Kingdom
Preceded by Garret Wellesley	Earl Cowley; 2016–present	Incumbent heir apparent: Henry Wellesley, Viscount Dangan
Preceded by Garret Wellesley	Baron Cowley; 2016–present	Incumbent heir apparent: Henry Wellesley, Viscount Dangan
