= Arthur Wellesley, 4th Earl Cowley =

British actor and peer (1890–1962)

Lieutenant The Right Honourable The Earl Cowley

Personal details
- Born: Christian Arthur Wellesley; 25 December 1890
- Died: 29 August 1962 (aged 71)
- Spouse(s): Mae Pickard (m. 1914; div. 1933) Mary Elsie May (after 1933)
- Children: 6
- Parent(s): Henry Wellesley, 3rd Earl Cowley; Lady Violet Nevill
- Education: Royal Military Academy, Sandhurst

Military service
- Allegiance: United Kingdom
- Branch/service: 5th Lancers
- Rank: Lieutenant

Lieutenant Christian Arthur Wellesley, 4th Earl Cowley (25 December 1890 – 29 August 1962), known as Viscount Dangan from 1895 to 1919, was an English aristocrat and actor known by the name Arthur Wellesley.

== Early life ==
Wellesley was born on 25 December 1890. He was the eldest son of Henry Wellesley, 3rd Earl Cowley and his first wife, Lady Violet Nevill. His parents divorced in 1897 after which his mother married Col. Robert Edward Myddelton in 1898. From his mother's second marriage, he was the elder half-brother of Idina Joan Myddelton (wife of the 3rd Baron Ashcombe), Ririd Myddelton (who married Lady Mary Petty-Fitzmaurice, sister of the 8th Marquess of Lansdowne), and Thomas Foulk Myddelton. From his father's second marriage to Lady Hartopp (née Hon. Millicent Wilson, the former wife of Sir Charles Hartopp, Bt and daughter of Lord Nunburnholme), he had two more half-siblings: Lady Diana Wellesley (wife of the 2nd Baron Glentoran) and Lady Cecilia Wellesley. From his father's third marriage to Clare (née Stapleton) Buxton (the former wife of Geoffrey Buxton of Dunston Hall, and daughter of Sir Francis Stapleton, Bt), he had a younger half-brother, Hon. Henry Wellesley.

His paternal grandparents were William Wellesley, 2nd Earl Cowley, and the former Emily Gwendoline Peers-Williams (a daughter of Thomas Peers Williams MP for Great Marlow). His maternal grandparents were William Nevill, 1st Marquess of Abergavenny and the former Caroline Vanden-Bempde-Johnstone (a daughter of Sir John Vanden-Bempde-Johnstone, 2nd Baronet).

== Career ==
He was educated at Royal Military Academy, Sandhurst. He gained the rank of Lieutenant in the 5th Lancers and was an artillery officer during World War I. When his "father refused to make him any allowance he found himself unable to keep up with the other officers on his army pay and resigned."

Upon his father's death on 15 January 1919, he succeeded as the 5th Baron Cowley of Wellesley, the 4th Viscount Dangan, and the 4th Earl Cowley.

=== Acting career ===
Wellesley then spent a few weeks as a cab driver before becoming a "paint room laborer with the Quinlan Opera Company of London. From there he went to the Gaiety Theatre as a chorus man with George Edward's company."

Known on the stage as Arthur Wellesley, he played prominent roles in London in The Hottentot at the Queen's Theatre in London, Betty, and Fallen Angels, and was once leading man with Tallulah Bankhead. He met his first wife while playing in The Girl on the Film.

== Personal life ==
On 24 February 1914, Viscount Dangan married Mae Josephine Callicott, a former New York showgirl who was known as Mae Pickard, at St. Patrick's Cathedral in New York City. At the time of his wedding, it was reported that "Lord Dangan was cut adrift by his father some years ago, but is still, or at least was up to the time he married an American show girl, in the good graces of his aunt and uncle, the very wealthy Lord and Lady Hythe. Lady Hythe was the sister of Lord Dangan's mother." Before their divorce in 1933, (Note: Lord Cowley had sought a divorce from Mae Pickard in London in 1926, but a jury refused it. He had named English actor Humphrey Kent as correspondent.) they were the parents of:

- Michael Wellesley, Viscount Dagan (1915–1922), who died young.
- Lady Patricia Mary Anne Wellesley (1918–1944), who served with the Women's Royal Naval Service during the World War II.
- Denis Arthur Wellesley, 5th Earl Cowley (1921–1968), who married Elizabeth Papillon, daughter of Pelham Papillon, in 1944. They divorced in 1950 and married Annette O'Hara, daughter of Maj. James J. O'Hara, in 1950. After her death, he married Janet Elizabeth Aiyar, daughter of Ramiah Aiyar, in 1961.
- Lady Colleen Wellesley (1925–2003), who married Dr. Paul Hanlon, a son of Edward F. Hanlon, in 1945.

On 18 June 1933, a day after his divorce from his first wife, he was married to Mary Elsie (née May) Himes by the Rev. Brewster Adams, a Baptist minister, at the home of Harry Atkinson, Lord Cowley's attorney. His new wife, whom he met while "she was working as a hat check girl at a road house near Reno" was divorced from Joseph T. Himes of San Francisco three weeks before their wedding. Together, they were the parents of:

- Garret Graham Wellesley, 7th Earl Cowley (1934–2016), who married Elizabeth Suzanne Lennon, daughter of Hayes Lennon, in 1960. They divorced in 1966 and he married Isabelle O'Bready in 1968. They divorced in 1981 and he married Paige Deming, daughter of Joseph Grove Deming, in 1981. After her death in 2008, he married Carola Marion Erskine-Hill, daughter of Sir Robert Erskine-Hill, 2nd Baronet, in 2012.
- Hon. Brian Timothy Wellesley (b. 1938)

In 1935, a forest fire raging over the foothills of the Sierra Nevada threatened Lord Cowley's ranch home, known as Wellesley Ranch, in Lakeview, about five miles north of Carson City, Nevada.

His first wife died in London on 5 June 1946. He died on 29 August 1962. Upon his death, he was succeeded in his titles by his eldest son, Denis. Upon the 5th Earl's death in 1968, his son Richard succeeded to the earldom. As Richard died without male issue in 1975, the earldom passed to the 4th Earl's second son, Garret, who was succeeded by his son Graham, the 8th, and current, Earl Cowley.

Peerage of the United Kingdom
Preceded by Henry Arthur Mornington Wellesley	Earl Cowley; 1916–1962	Succeeded by Denis Wellesley
