= Duke of Wellington, Belgravia =

Pub in Belgravia, London

The Duke of Wellington
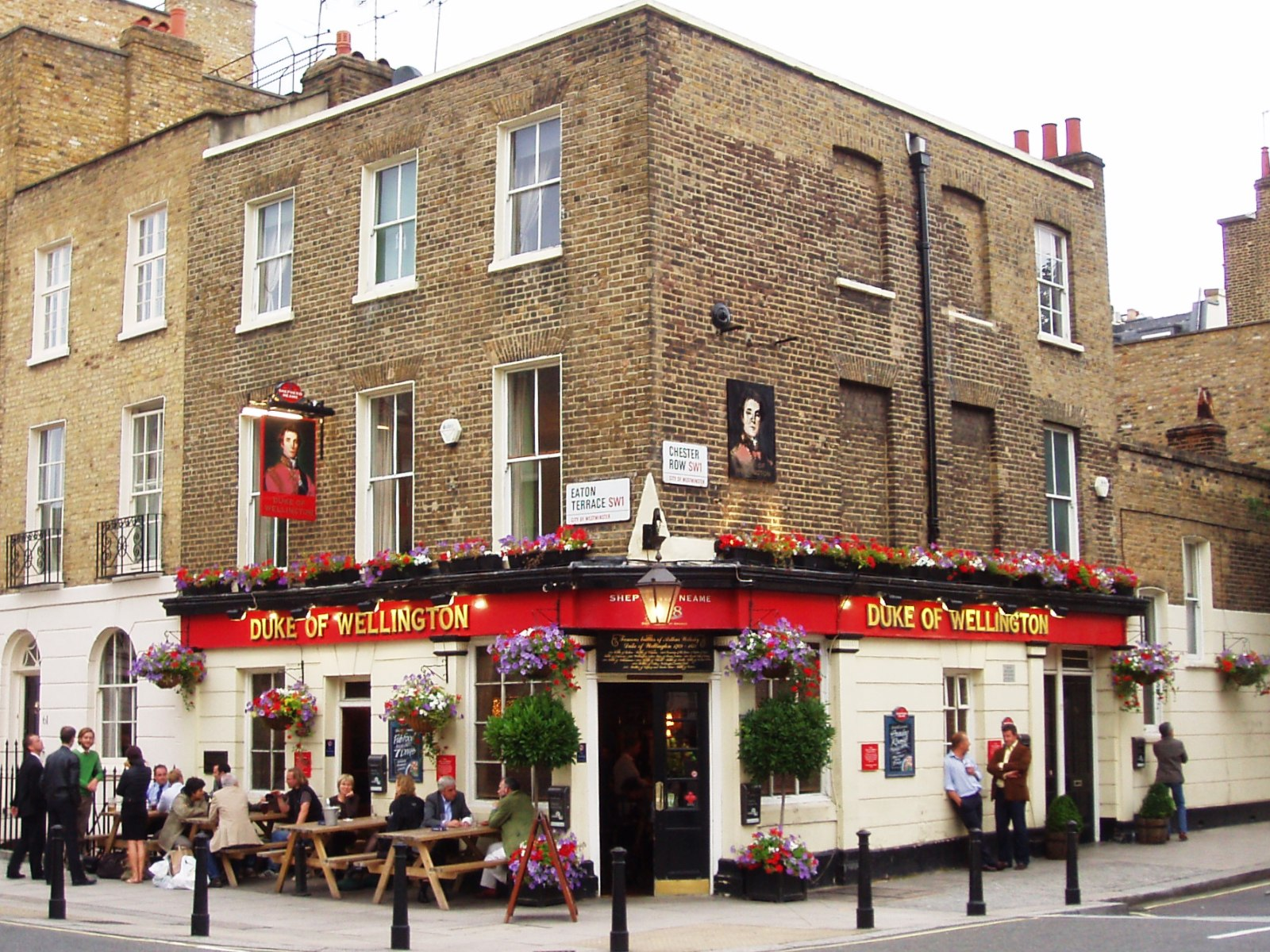
- The Duke of Wellington, Belgravia, London
- Type: Public house
- Location: 63 Eaton Terrace, Belgravia, London
- Coordinates: 51°29′35.29″N 0°9′11.84″W

Listed Building – Grade II
- Official name: DUKE OF WELLINGTON PUBLIC HOUSE
- Designated: 01-Dec-1987
- Reference no.: 1066857

The Duke of Wellington is a pub at 63 Eaton Terrace, Belgravia, London.

It is a Grade II listed building, built in the early 19th century.
