= Duke of Wellington, Bethnal Green =

Former pub in Bethnal Green, London

Coordinates: 51.530254°N 0.0497253°W

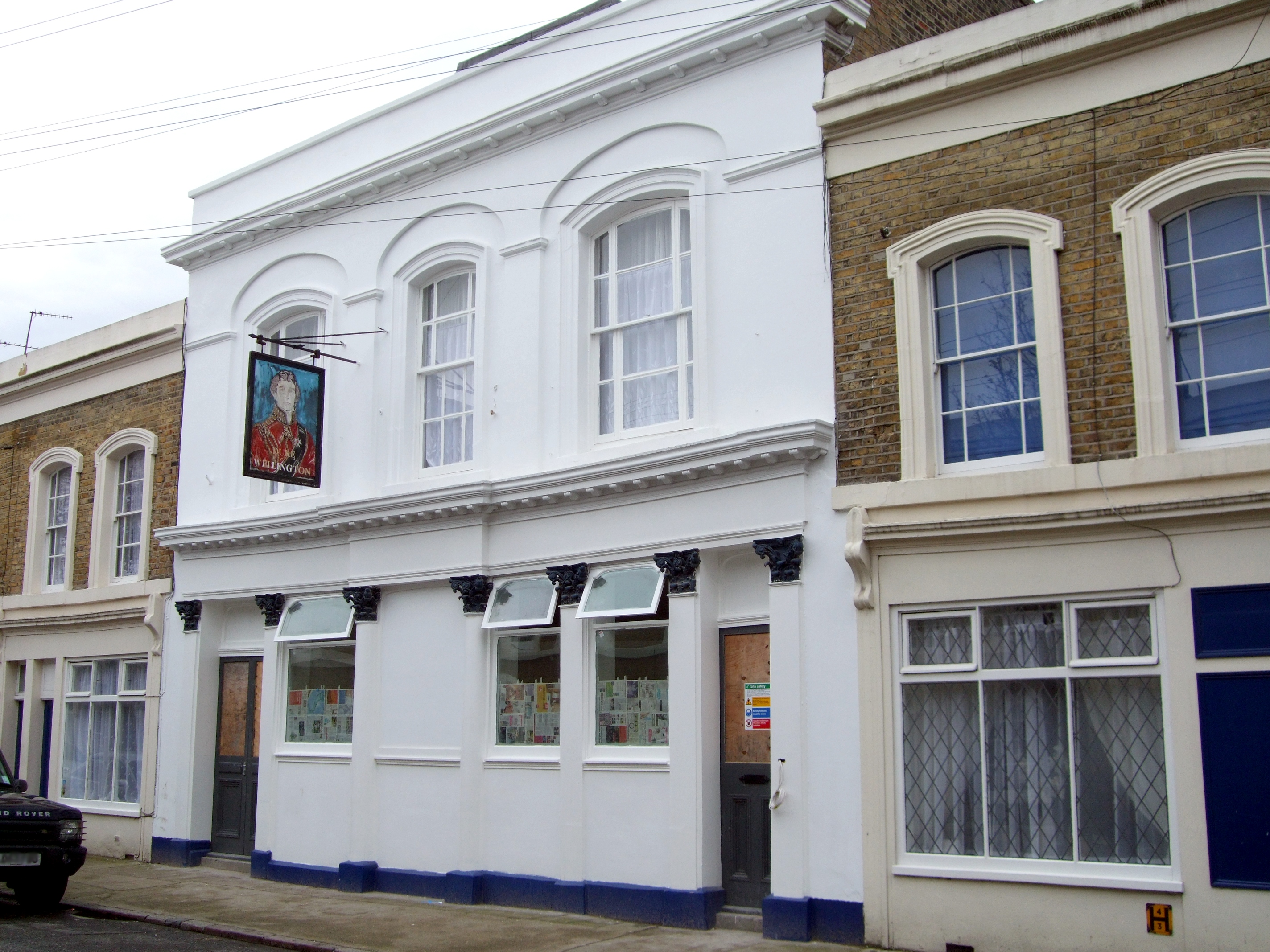
The Duke of Wellington, Bethnal Green, 2009

The Duke of Wellington is a former pub at 52 Cyprus Street, Bethnal Green, London E2.

It is a Grade II listed building, built in the mid-19th century.

It has closed as a pub and been converted into residential flats.
