= Garret Wellesley, 7th Earl Cowley =

English-American banker (1934–2016)

The Right Honourable The Earl Cowley

Member of the House of Lords
- Lord Temporal
- as a hereditary peer 13 December 1975 – 11 November 1999
- Preceded by: The 6th Earl Cowley
- Succeeded by: Seat abolished (Note: Pursuant to the House of Lords Act 1999.)

Personal details
- Born: Garret Graham Wellesley; 30 July 1934 Nevada, U.S.
- Died: 17 June 2016 (aged 81)
- Spouse(s): Elizabeth Suzanne Lennon (m. 1960; div. 1966) Isabelle O'Bready (1968–1981) Paige Deming (m. 1981; died 2008) Carola Erskine-Hill Darling (m. 2012)
- Relations: Henry Wellesley, 3rd Earl Cowley (grandfather)
- Parent(s): Arthur Wellesley, 4th Earl Cowley; Mary Elsie Himes
- Education: University of South Carolina; Harvard Business School

Garret Wellesley, 7th Earl Cowley (30 July 1934 – 17 June 2016), was an English-American banker.

== Early life ==
Wellesley was born in Nevada on 30 July 1934. He was the son of actor Arthur Wellesley, 4th Earl Cowley (1890–1962), and his second wife, Mary Elsie Himes (1906–2003). Before his birth, his father had sold Draycot House and the Draycot Estate in 1920, at which time it encompassed 4,320 acres. His parents met while his mother "was working as a hat check girl at a road house near Reno" and was divorced from Joseph T. Himes of San Francisco three weeks before their wedding. In 1935, a forest fire raging over the foothills of the Sierra Nevada threatened his parents' ranch, known as Wellesley Ranch, in Lakeview, about five miles north of Carson City, Nevada.

From his father's first marriage to actress Mae Picard, he had an elder half-brother, Denis Wellesley, 5th Earl Cowley, who succeeded to their father's titles upon his death in 1962. His paternal grandparents were Henry Wellesley, 3rd Earl Cowley, and his first wife, Lady Violet Nevill (daughter of William Nevill, 1st Marquess of Abergavenny).

He graduated from the University of Southern California in Los Angeles in 1957 and received an MBA at Harvard Business School in 1962.

== Career ==
After USC, Wellesley spent three years in the Counterintelligence Corps of the U.S. Army. After obtaining his MBA, he began a career in finance and banking, working as an investment analyst with Wells Fargo between 1962 and 1964, an investment counsellor with Dodge & Cox from 1964 to 1966, vice-president and investment counsellor with Thorndike, Doran, Paine & Lewis from 1967 to 1969 and a senior vice-president with Shareholders Capital Corporation between 1969 and 1974.

In 1975, he unexpectedly succeeded to his title after his nephew Richard died aged just 29. He continued to work in finance as group vice-president with Bank of America in London, between 1978 and 1985 and then as independent financial advisor between until 1990 before becoming an investment partner with Thomas R. Miller & Son in Bermuda. He also took his seat in the House of Lords.

== Personal life ==
Lord Cowley was married four times. His first marriage was on 16 September 1960 to Elizabeth Suzanne Lennon, a daughter of Haynes Lennon of South Carolina. Before their divorce in 1966, they were the parents of two children:

- Lady Elizabeth Tara Lennon Wellesley (born 1962), an artist.
- Garret Graham Wellesley, 8th Earl Cowley (born 1965), who co-founded the peer-to-peer lending firm Wellesley & Co.; he married Claire L. Brighton, only daughter of Peter W. Brighton of Stowbridge, in 1990.

He was married to Isabelle O'Bready of Sherbrooke, Quebec, from 1968 to 1981 and to Paige Deming, a daughter of Joseph Grove Deming of Reno, Nevada, from 1981, with whom he adopted "several daughters."

- Lady Sarah Paige Wellesley, who married Frank Mosier, eldest son of Frank Mosier of Saratoga, New York.

After the death of his third wife in 2008, Lord Cowley married Carola Marion Stormonth (née Erskine-Hill) Darling (born 1943) on 15 February 2012. The widow of Capt. Robin Andrew Stormonth Darling, Carola was the eldest daughter of Sir Robert Erskine-Hill, 2nd Baronet, and the former Christine Alison Johnstone (only daughter of Capt. Henry James Johnstone). From her first marriage to Sir Richard Brooke, 11th Baronet, which ended in divorce, she is the mother of Sir Richard Brooke, 12th Baronet.

Lord Cowley died on Friday, 17 June 2016, after a short illness. His funeral was held in London and he was succeeded in the title by his son, Graham.

== Notes ==
Peerage of the United Kingdom
Preceded by Richard Wellesley	Earl Cowley; 1975–2016; Member of the House of Lords (1975–1999)	Succeeded by Garret Wellesley
Preceded by Richard Wellesley	Baron Cowley; 1975–2016	Succeeded by Garret Wellesley
