= Humphrey Kent =

English cricketer

Humphrey Neild Kent (2 November 1893 – 19 April 1972) was an English first-class cricketer active 1920–27 who played for Middlesex. He was born in Watford; died in Upper Norwood.
