= Earl Cowley =

Earldom in the Peerage of the United Kingdom

- Arms: Quarterly: 1st & 4th, Gules, a Cross Argent, in each quarter five Plates saltirewise (Wellesley); 2nd & 3rd, Or, a Lion rampant Gules, ducally gorged Gold (Cowley); over all at fess point an Annulet for difference. Crest: Out of a Ducal Coronet Or, a Demi-Lion rampant Gules, holding a Staff erect proper, and therefrom flowing to the sinister, a forked Pennon, from the Staff two thirds per pale Argent and Gules, charged with a Cross Gules. Supporters: On either side a Lion Gules, ducally gorged and chained reflexed over the back Or, charged on the shoulder with an Annulet for difference.
- Creation date: 11 April 1857
- Creation: First
- Created by: Queen Victoria
- Peerage: Peerage of the United Kingdom
- First holder: Henry Wellesley, 1st Earl Cowley
- Present holder: Graham Wellesley, 8th Earl Cowley
- Heir apparent: Henry Wellesley, Viscount Dangan
- Remainder to: the 1st Earl’s heirs male of the body legally begotten
- Subsidiary titles: Viscount Dangan; Baron Cowley
- Status: Extant
- Motto: PORRO UNUM EST NECESSARIUM (Moreover, one thing is necessary)

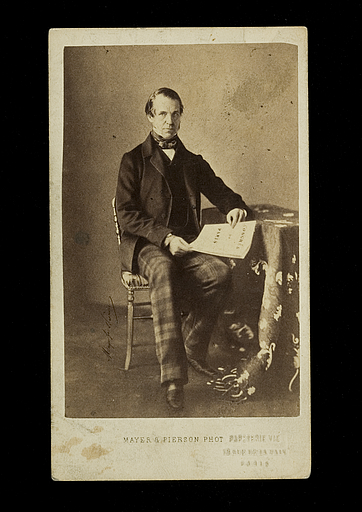
Henry Wellesley, 1st Earl Cowley

Earl Cowley is a title in the Peerage of the United Kingdom. It was created in 1857 for the diplomat Henry Wellesley, 2nd Baron Cowley. He was Ambassador to France from 1852 to 1867. He was made Viscount Dangan, of Dangan in the County of Meath, at the same time as he was given the earldom. This title is also in the Peerage of the United Kingdom. Lord Cowley was the eldest son of Henry Wellesley, 1st Baron Cowley, who like his son served as Ambassador to France. In 1828 he was created Baron Cowley, of Wellesley in the County of Somerset, in the Peerage of the United Kingdom. A member of the prominent Wellesley family, Cowley was the fifth and youngest son of Garret Wellesley, 1st Earl of Mornington, and the younger brother of Arthur Wellesley, 1st Duke of Wellington, and Richard Wellesley, 1st Marquess Wellesley.

The first Earl was succeeded by his eldest son, the second Earl. He was a Lieutenant-Colonel in the Coldstream Guards and fought in the Crimean War. His great-great-grandson (the titles having descended from father to son), the sixth Earl, served as a Lord-in-waiting (government whip in the House of Lords) from January to March 1974 in the Conservative government of Edward Heath. He was succeeded in 1975 by his uncle, the seventh Earl, who was the eldest son from the fourth Earl's second marriage and the half-brother of the fifth Earl. As of 2017, the titles are held by the latter's son, the eighth Earl, who succeeded in 2016. As a male-line descendant of the first Earl of Mornington, he is also in remainder to this peerage and its subsidiary titles, which are now held by his kinsman, the 9th Duke of Wellington.

== Baron Cowley (1828) ==
- Henry Wellesley, 1st Baron Cowley (1773–1847)
- Henry Richard Charles Wellesley, 2nd Baron Cowley (1804–1884) (created Earl Cowley in 1857)

=== Earl Cowley (1857) ===
- Henry Richard Charles Wellesley, 1st Earl Cowley (1804–1884)
- William Henry Wellesley, 2nd Earl Cowley (1834–1895)
- Henry Arthur Mornington Wellesley, 3rd Earl Cowley (1866–1919)
- Christian Arthur Wellesley, 4th Earl Cowley (1890–1962)
- Denis Arthur Wellesley, 5th Earl Cowley (1921–1968)
- Richard Francis Wellesley, 6th Earl Cowley (1946–1975)
- Garret Graham Wellesley, 7th Earl Cowley (1934–2016)
- Garret Graham Wellesley, 8th Earl Cowley (born 1965)

The heir apparent is the present holder's son, Henry Arthur Peter Wellesley, Viscount Dangan (born 1991).

== Line of succession ==
- Henry Wellesley, 1st Baron Cowley (1773–1847)
  - Henry Wellesley, 1st Earl Cowley (1804–1884)
    - William Wellesley, 2nd Earl Cowley (1834–1895)
      - Henry Wellesley, 3rd Earl Cowley (1866–1919)
        - Arthur Wellesley, 4th Earl Cowley (1890–1962)
          - Denis Wellesley, 5th Earl Cowley (1921–1968)
            - Richard Wellesley, 6th Earl Cowley (1946–1975)
          - Garret Wellesley, 7th Earl Cowley (1934–2016)
            - Graham Wellesley, 8th Earl Cowley (born 1965)
              - (1) Henry Wellesley, Viscount Dangan (born 1991)
              - (2) Hon. Bertram Wellesley (born 1999)
          - Hon. Brian Wellesley (1938-2026)
        - Hon. Henry Wellesley (1907–1981)
          - (3) Henry Wellesley (born 1970)
            - (4) Jay Wellesley (born 2001)
          - (5) Richard Wellesley (born 1972)
  - Hon. William Wellesley (1806–1875)
    - Gerald Edward Wellesley (1846–1915)
      - Gerald Valerian Wellesley (1885–1961)
        - Julian Valerian Wellesley (1933–1996)
          - (6) William Valerian Wellesley (born 1966)
            - (7) Julian Valerian Arthur Wellesley (born 1997)
            - (8) George Edward Valerian Wellesley (born 2007)
  - Hon. Gerald Valerian Wellesley (1809–1882)
    - Albert Wellesley (?–?)
