= Portrait of the Duke of Wellington =

Portrait of the Duke of Wellington may refer to:

- Portrait of the Duke of Wellington (Gérard), an 1814 painting by François Gérard
- Portrait of the Duke of Wellington (Goya), an 1812–1814 painting by Francisco de Goya
- Portrait of the Duke of Wellington (Lawrence), an 1815–1816 painting by Sir Thomas Lawrence
- Portrait of the Duke of Wellington (Phillips), an 1814 painting by Thomas Phillips
- Portrait of the Duke of Wellington (Waterloo Chamber), an 1815 painting by Sir Thomas Lawrence
- Unfinished Wellington, an 1829 painting by Thomas Lawrence

== See also ==
- Portrait of Arthur Wellesley, a 1795 painting by John Hoppner
