= Wellesley & Co. =

Wellesley
- Type: Private
- Industry: Personal finance, peer-to-peer lending, Alternative finance, Bonds
- Founded: 2013
- Headquarters: London, UK
- Key people: Graham Wellesley, 8th Earl Cowley, CEO and Co-Founder
- Products: Peer-to-peer lending, Bonds Property Investment Bonds, Mini Bonds
- Website: www.wellesley.co.uk

Wellesley Group was an alternative property investment platform, that issued Bond investments to the UK retail market. The Wellesley Group consisted of Wellesley & Co., Wellesley Finance Plc and Wellesley Group Investors Ltd. Wellesley Group was named after co-founder Graham Wellesley, 8th Earl Cowley, who was previously Chief Executive of IFX and Finspreads.

Founded in November 2013 and headquartered in London, UK, Wellesley Group's core objective waWess to provide investors with higher rates of return that cannot be accessed through traditional investment routes, whilst simultaneously providing finance to experienced commercial borrowers within the UK residential property market.

Wellesley went into administration in April 2025.

== Overview ==
Wellesley allows individuals to lend money directly to the UK's small and medium-sized housebuilders, as well as property developers. On 2 April 2014, Wellesley announced that it had made an £8.3m loan, the largest to be made on a peer-to-peer platform at that time. The loan, a bridging loan, is backed by a range of 27 properties in several south London boroughs and Essex.

As part of an auto-matching process, lenders' funds are matched to all loans on a volume weighted basis, which gives investors a proportionate amount of each loan. The process runs once a week in order to match lenders to every single loan.

In July 2014, Wellesley & Co. announced the launch of the Wellesley Mini-Bond, which allows Bondholders to invest their money directly to Wellesley Finance Plc in turn for a fixed interest rate that is paid every six months. As and when the Wellesley Mini-Bond has matured, the full amount of a lenders investment will be repaid. The Mini-Bond offered by Wellesley is only available to UK-Based individuals, companies, charities and trusts. Another bond offered by Wellesley & Co, is The Wellesley Listed Bond, which again is issued by Wellesley Finance Plc.

== Industry awards ==
In 2014, Wellesley won an award for being the fastest growing platform of the year out of a number of platforms surveyed by AltFi, an online alternative finance publication. In 2015, financial news site Bridging and Commercial awarded Wellesley 'P2P Lender of the Year'.

== Company Voluntary Arrangement (CVA) ==
In September 2020 the company engaged Duff & Phelps to draw up a Company Voluntary Arrangement to try to avoid what they described as a “disorderly wind-down and likely insolvency which would result in an inferior outcome for all investors”. If the CVA were to be agreed by the creditors, unsecured bondholders may get 1p per £1 invested whilst secured investors may get up to 84p per £1; if not the firm would go into administration.

The CVA was approved, by 94% of creditors, and Wellesley & Co continued to wind down its regulated operations, recording a loss of £520,000 for 2021.

== See also ==
- Peer-to-peer lending
- Alternative finance
- Bond (finance)
