= Henry Wellesley, 3rd Earl Cowley =

English aristocrat (1866–1919)

The Right Honourable The Earl Cowley JP
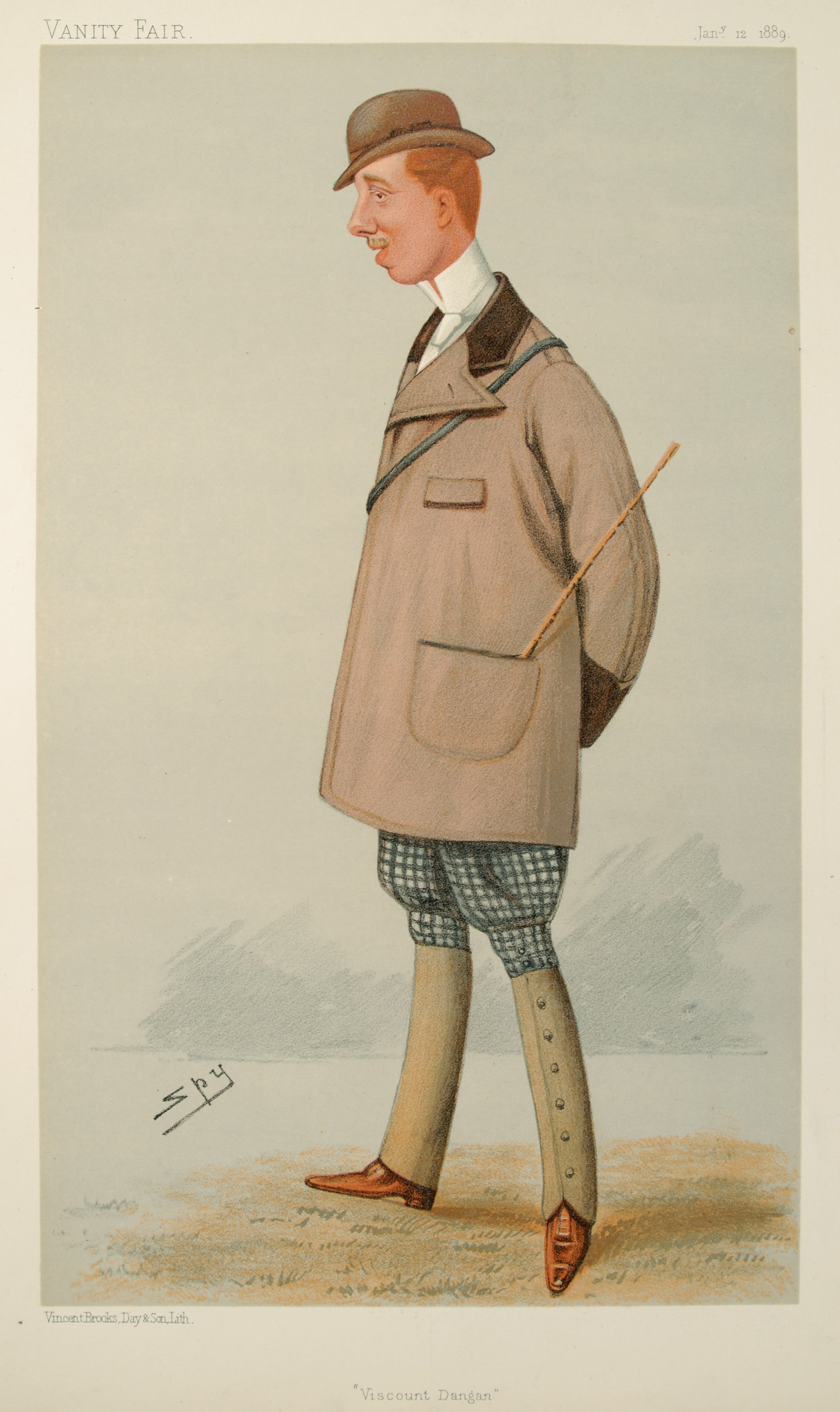
- Caricature of Viscount Dangan, published in Vanity Fair, 12 January 1889.

Member of the House of Lords
- Lord Temporal
- In office 28 February 1895 – 15 January 1919
- Preceded by: The 2nd Earl Cowley
- Succeeded by: The 4th Earl Cowley

Personal details
- Born: Henry Arthur Mornington Wellesley; 14 January 1866 Wilton Place, London
- Died: 15 January 1919 (aged 53) Chippenham, Wiltshire
- Spouse(s): Lady Violet Nevill (m. 1889; div. 1897) Hon. Millicent Wilson (m. 1905; div. 1913) Clare Stapleton (m. 1914)
- Relations: Henry Wellesley, 1st Earl Cowley (grandfather); Thomas Peers Williams (grandfather)
- Parent(s): William Wellesley, 2nd Earl Cowley; Emily Gwendoline Williams
- Education: Eton College

Henry Arthur Mornington Wellesley, 3rd Earl Cowley (14 January 1866 – 15 January 1919), styled as Viscount Dangan between 1884 and 1895, was an English aristocrat.

== Early life ==
The coat of arms of the Earl of Cowley

Henry was born at Wilton Place, London, on 14 January 1866. He was the eldest son of William Wellesley, 2nd Earl Cowley (1834–1895), and the former Emily Gwendoline Peers-Williams (1839–1932). His only sibling, Lady Eva Wellesley, married, as his second wife, Randolph Wemyss, Laird of Wemyss Castle and Chief of Clan Wemyss.

His mother was the second daughter of Col. Thomas Peers Williams, MP for Great Marlow, and the former Emily Bacon (a daughter of Anthony Bushby Bacon of Elcott). His paternal grandparents were Henry Wellesley, 1st Earl Cowley (the eldest son of Henry Wellesley, 1st Baron Cowley, and Lady Charlotte Cadogan, the daughter of the 1st Earl Cadogan), and the Hon. Olivia Cecilia FitzGerald (a daughter of the 20th Baroness de Ros and Lord Henry FitzGerald, the fourth son of the 1st Duke of Leinster). His grandfather, the 1st Earl Cowley, was Queen Victoria's Ambassador to France for fifteen years and was a nephew of the 1st Duke of Wellington and the 1st Marquess Wellesley. Lord Cowley's aunt, Lady Feodorowna Wellesley, was married to Francis Bertie, 1st Viscount Bertie of Thame, who also served as the British ambassador to France.

== Career ==
He attended Eton College between 1880 and 1881.

He was a Captain in the Wiltshire Regiment and gained the rank of Lieutenant in 1893 in the Royal Gloucestershire Hussars. Upon his father's death in 1895, he became the third Earl Cowley. Between 1899 and 1900, Lord Cowley fought in the Boer War with the Imperial Yeomanry.

He held the office of Justice of the Peace for Wiltshire.

== Personal life ==
In 1888 he was sued for breach of promise by the actress and Gaiety Girl Phyllis Broughton. The case was settled for £2,500. His lawyers emphasised that the ending of the engagement was not related to the actress's character.

On 17 December 1889, at St George's Church in Hanover Square, Westminster, he was married to Lady Violet Nevill, the daughter of William Nevill, 1st Marquess of Abergavenny, and the former Caroline Vanden-Bempde-Johnstone (a daughter of Sir John Vanden-Bempde-Johnstone, 2nd Baronet). Before she divorced him on 2 February 1897 alleging "misconduct", they were the parents of one son: (Note: After their divorce, Lady Cowley married Col. Robert Edward Myddelton (1866–1949) in 1898. They were the parents of Idina Joan Myddelton (wife of Roland Cubitt, 3rd Baron Ashcombe), Ririd Myddelton (who married (Mary) Margaret Mercer Nairne, a daughter of Maj. Lord Charles Mercer Nairne and Lady Violet Elliot-Murray-Kynymound and sister of George Petty-Fitzmaurice, 8th Marquess of Lansdowne), and Thomas Foulk Myddelton.)

- Christian Arthur Wellesley, 4th Earl Cowley (1890–1962), an actor and army officer who married actress Mae Pickard in 1914. They divorced in 1933 and he remarried to Mrs Mary Himes (née Mary Elsie May) in 1933.

He married, secondly, Hon. Millicent Florence Eleanor (née Wilson) Cradock-Hartopp (1872–1952) on 14 December 1905 at Colombo in Sri Lanka. Millicent, the divorced wife of Sir Charles Cradock-Hartopp, 5th Baronet, was a daughter of Charles Wilson, 1st Baron Nunburnholme, and the former Florence Jane Helen Wellesley. In 1912, while still married to his second wife, Lord Cowley was a named as a correspondent in the divorce suite of Geoffrey Charles Buxton against his wife. Before she divorced him in 1913, citing his "desertion and misconduct with Mrs. G.C. Buxton", they were the parents of:

- Hon. Henry Gerald Valerian Francis Wellesley (1907–1981), who married Doris Caroline Sabia Kennedy, daughter of Edward Robert Kennedy, in 1929. They divorced in 1953 and he married Nancy Joan Hilliam, daughter of Bentley Collingwood Hilliam, in 1954. His second marriage was annulled in 1955 and he married Marina Isabel Sherlock Eustace, daughter of Frank Rowland Eustace, in 1957. They divorced in 1969 and he married, fourthly, Valerie Rose Pitman, daughter of Christian Ernest Pitman, in 1969.

His third and final marriage was to Clare Florence Mary (née Stapleton) Buxton on 19 January 1914. Clare, who was by then divorced from her husband Geoffrey Buxton of Dunston Hall, was a daughter of Sir Francis Stapleton, 8th Baronet, and Mary Catherine Gladstone. They were the parents of:

- Lady Diana Mary Wellesley (c. 1914 – 1984). She married Col. Daniel Dixon, 2nd Baron Glentoran, son of Herbert Dixon, 1st Baron Glentoran, and Hon. Emily Bingham (a daughter of John Bingham, 5th Baron Clanmorris).
- Lady Cecilia Katherine Wellesley (1917–1952), who married John Claude Smiley, son of Maj. Sir John Smiley, 2nd Baronet, in 1936. They divorced in 1942 and she married Lt.-Col. Norman David Melville Johnstone, son of Major Charles Melville Johnstone, in 1942. They divorced in 1950 and she married, thirdly, to Norman Hyman Wachman, son of Woolf Wachman, in 1950.

Lord Cowley died at Draycot House in Wiltshire on 15 January 1919, at age 53. He was buried at St James' Church Draycot Cerne, near Chippenham. His widow, the Dowager Countess of Cowley, died in a fire on 8 May 1949.

Peerage of the United Kingdom
Preceded by William Wellesley	Earl Cowley; 1895–1919; Member of the House of Lords (1895–1919)	Succeeded by Arthur Wellesley
Preceded by William Wellesley	Baron Cowley; 1895–1919	Succeeded by Arthur Wellesley
