= Henry Wellesley, 1st Earl Cowley =

British diplomat (1804–1884)

The Right Honourable The Earl Cowley KG GCB PC
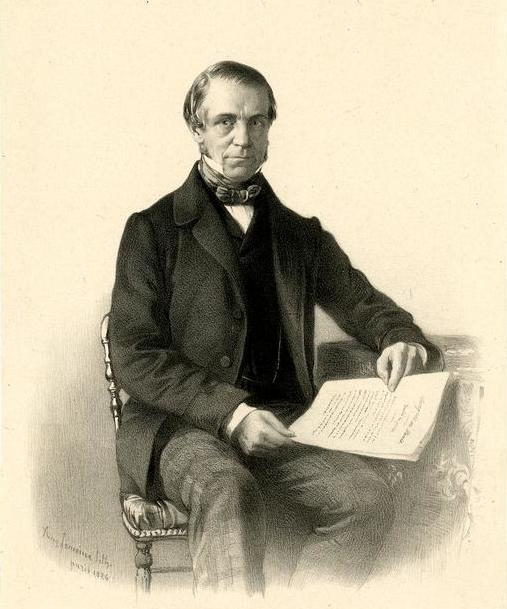

British Ambassador to France
- In office 1852–1867
- Monarch: Queen Victoria
- Preceded by: The Marquess of Normanby
- Succeeded by: The Lord Lyons

Personal details
- Born: 17 June 1804 Hertford Street, Mayfair, London
- Died: 15 July 1884 (aged 80) Albemarle Street, London
- Spouse: Olivia Cecilia FitzGerald (d. 1885)
- Education: Brasenose College, Oxford

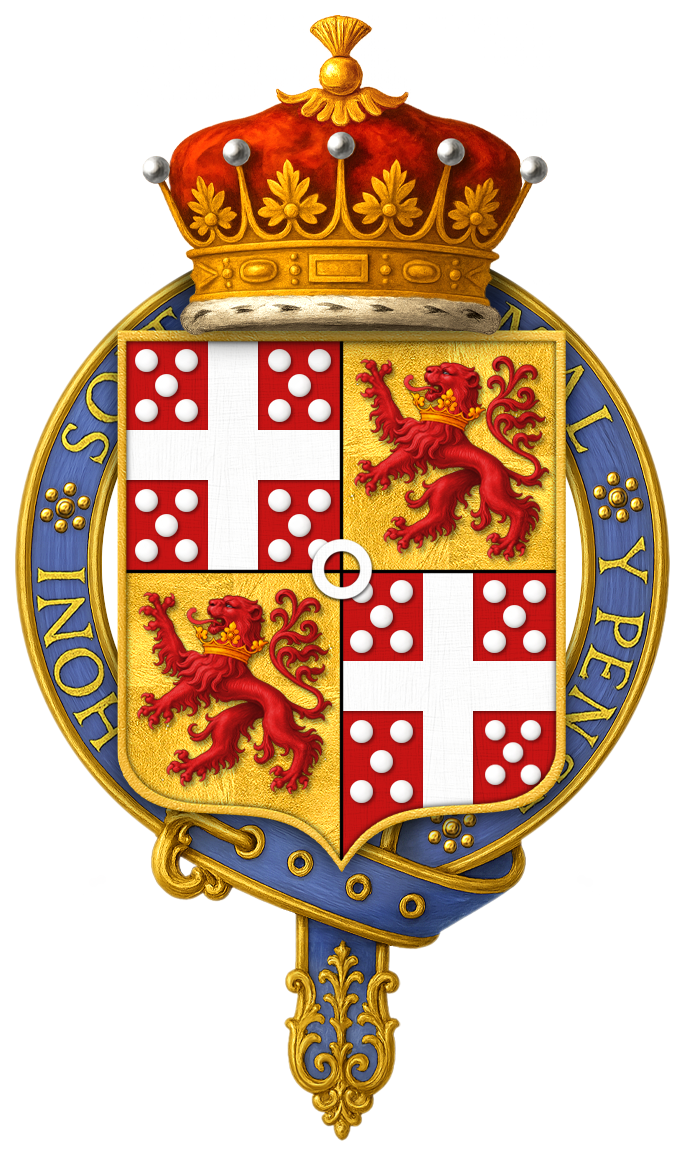
Quartered arms of Henry Wellesley, 1st Earl Cowley, KG, GCB, PC

Henry Richard Charles Wellesley, 1st Earl Cowley (17 June 1804 – 15 July 1884), known as The Lord Cowley between 1847 and 1857, was a British diplomat. He served as British Ambassador to France between 1852 and 1867.

== Background and education ==
Wellesley was born in 1804 in Cheshunt, Hertfordshire, the eldest son of Henry Wellesley, 1st Baron Cowley, and Lady Charlotte, daughter of Charles Cadogan, 1st Earl Cadogan. He was a nephew of the 1st Duke of Wellington and the 1st Marquess Wellesley. He was educated at Eton and Brasenose College, Oxford.

== Diplomatic career ==
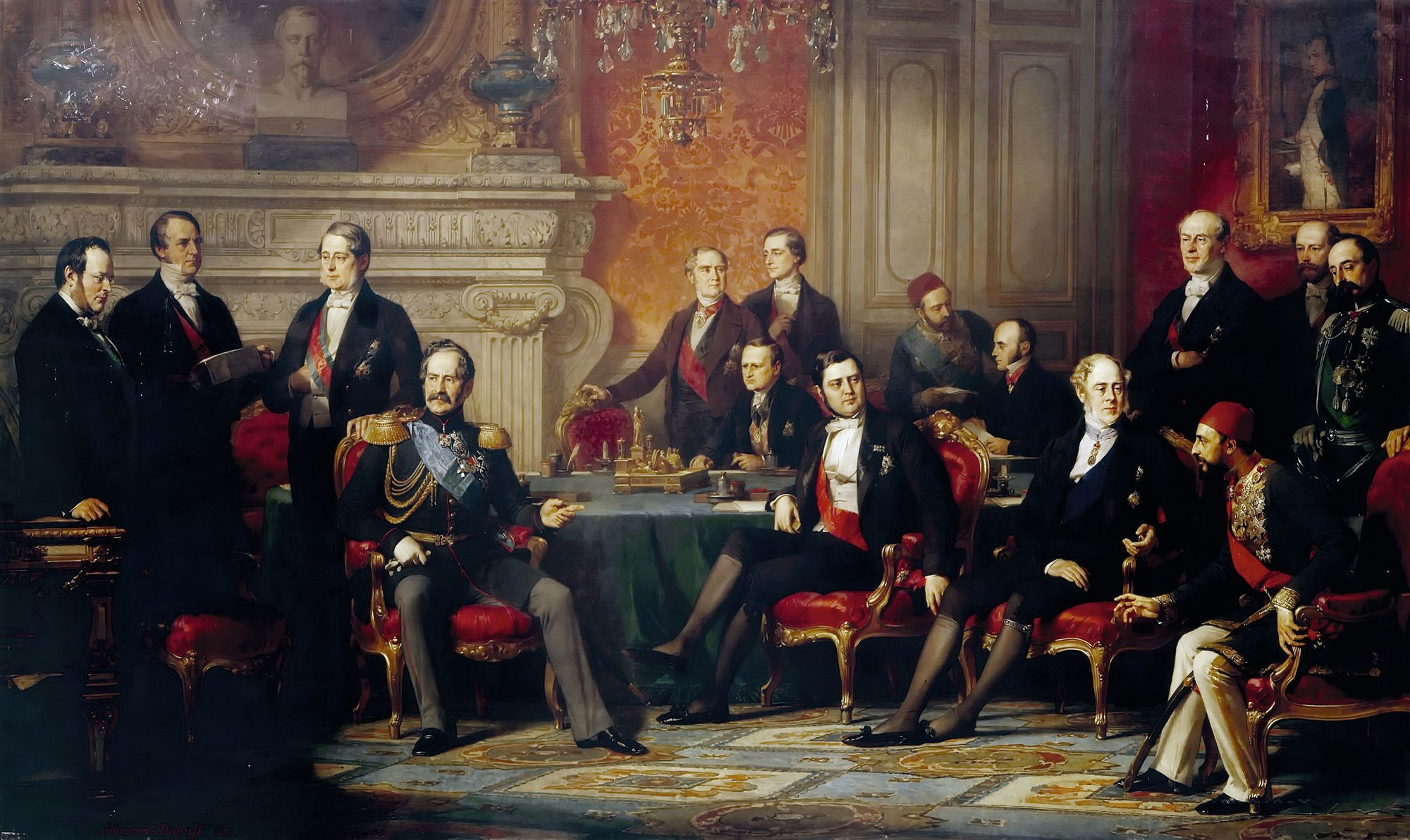
The Congress of Paris by Edouard Dubufe. Cowley is shown amongst the diplomats attending the conference to end the Crimean War.

Wellesley entered the diplomatic service in 1824, receiving his first important appointment in 1845, when he became Minister Plenipotentiary to the Ottoman Empire. This was followed in June 1851 by his appointment as Envoy Extraordinary and Minister Plenipotentiary to the reinstated diet of the German Confederation, a position which he only held for a short time, as he was chosen in 1852 to succeed Lord Normanby as the British ambassador in Paris. Lord Cowley, as Wellesley had become on his father's death in 1847, held this important post for fifteen years, and the story of his diplomatic life in Paris cannot be separated from the general history of England and France. As Minister during the greater part of the reign of Napoleon III, he conducted the delicate negotiations between the two countries during the time of those eastern complications which preceded and followed the Crimean War, and also during the excitement and unrest produced by the attempt made in 1858 by Felice Orsini to assassinate the emperor of the French; while his diplomatic skill was no less in evidence during the war between France and Austria and the subsequent course of events in Italy.

In 1857 he was created Viscount Dangan, in the County of Meath, and Earl Cowley. He was further honoured in 1866 when he was made a Knight of the Garter. Having assisted Richard Cobden to conclude the commercial treaty between Great Britain and France in 1860, he retired as ambassador in 1867.

== Personal life ==
On 22 October 1833 Lord Cowley married the Hon. Olivia Cecilia (d. 1885) at St George's Chapel, Windsor Castle, daughter of the 20th Baroness de Ros and Lord Henry FitzGerald (fourth son of the 1st Duke of Leinster). Together, they were the parents of three sons and two daughters:

- William Henry Wellesley, 2nd Earl Cowley (1834–1895)
- Lady Feodorowna Cecilia (1838–1920), who married Francis Bertie, 1st Viscount Bertie of Thame in 1874.
- Lady Sophia Georgiana Robertina (1840–1923), who married Charles Philip Yorke, 5th Earl of Hardwicke in 1863.
- Hon. Cecil Charles Foley (1842–1916), who served in the Royal Navy and died unmarried.
- Col. Hon. Frederick Arthur (1844–1931), who married Emma Anne Caroline Bloomfield Loftus, daughter of Lord Augustus Loftus, in 1873; they divorced after his affair with actress Kate Vaughan, whom he married in 1884 and divorced in 1897. He married thirdly Evelyn Katrine Gwenfra Wellesley, Dowager Duchess of Wellington (née Williams), in 1904; she was a daughter of Thomas Peers Williams, MP, and widow of Henry Wellesley, 3rd Duke of Wellington.

Lord Cowley died on 15 July 1884 at Albemarle Street, London. He succeeded in his titles by his eldest son, William. In 1863 Cowley inherited the former Long family estate of Draycot Cerne in Wiltshire from his kinsman the 5th Earl of Mornington, and he retired four years later. Through his youngest son, he was a grandfather of Sir Victor Wellesley.

He owned almost 6,000 acres.

Diplomatic posts
Preceded by Stratford Redcliffe	Minister Plenipotentiary to the Confederated States of the Swiss Cantons; 1848–1851	Succeeded by Sir Edmund Lyons, Bt
Preceded by Hon. William Fox-Strangways	Envoy Extraordinary and Minister Plenipotentiary to the German Confederation (Special Ambassador 1848–1851); 1848–1852	Succeeded by Sir Alexander Malet, Bt
Preceded by The Marquess of Normanby	British Ambassador to France; 1852 – 1867	Succeeded by The Lord Lyons
Peerage of the United Kingdom
New creation	Earl Cowley; 1857–1884	Succeeded by William Wellesley
Preceded by Henry Wellesley	Baron Cowley; 1847–1884	Succeeded by William Wellesley
