= Richard Wellesley, 6th Earl Cowley =

Richard Francis Wellesley, 6th Earl Cowley (12 June 1946 – 13 December 1975), known as Viscount Dangan from 1962 to 1968, was a British Conservative politician.

Cowley was the only son of Denis Arthur Wellesley, 5th Earl Cowley (eldest son of the actor Arthur Wellesley, 4th Earl Cowley), and his first wife Elizabeth Anne (née Papillon, a descendant of English politician Thomas Papillon), and was educated at Eton. He succeeded in the earldom on his father's early death in 1968 and took his seat on the Conservative benches in the House of Lords. He served briefly as a Lord-in-waiting (government whip in the House of Lords) under Edward Heath from January to March 1974.

Lord Cowley married Maria, daughter of Enrique Buenaño, in 1971. They had two daughters. He died in December 1975, aged only 29. As he had no sons he was succeeded in the earldom by his uncle Garret Wellesley.

Peerage of the United Kingdom
Preceded by Denis Arthur Wellesley	Earl Cowley; 1968–1975	Succeeded by Garret Graham Wellesley
