= William Wellesley, 2nd Earl Cowley =

English aristocrat & soldier (1834–1895)

Lieutenant Colonel The Right Honourable The Earl Cowley

Personal details
- Born: William Henry Wellesley; 25 August 1834 Stuttgart, Kingdom of Württemberg
- Died: 28 February 1895 (aged 60) Draycot House, Wiltshire
- Spouse: Emily Gwendolen Peers-Williams (m. 1863)
- Children: Henry Wellesley, 3rd Earl Cowley; Lady Eva Erskine-Wemyss
- Parent(s): Henry Wellesley, 1st Earl Cowley; Olivia Cecilia FitzGerald
- Education: Eton College

Military service
- Allegiance: United Kingdom
- Branch/service: Coldstream Guards
- Rank: Lieutenant colonel
- Battles/wars: Crimean War; Oudh Campaign
- Awards: Order of the Medjidie

Lieutenant Colonel William Henry Wellesley, 2nd Earl Cowley (25 August 1834 - 28 February 1895) was an English aristocrat and soldier.

== Early life ==
Wellesley was born on 25 August 1834 at Stuttgart, Kingdom of Württemberg. He was the eldest son of the former Hon. Olivia Cecilia FitzGerald (d. 1885) and Henry Wellesley, 1st Earl Cowley, who served as the British Ambassador to France between 1852 and 1867.

His younger siblings included Lady Feodorowna Cecilia (wife of the 1st Viscount Bertie), Lady Sophia Georgiana Robertina (wife of the 5th Earl of Hardwicke), Hon. Cecil Charles Foley (who served in the Royal Navy and died unmarried), and Col. Hon. Frederick Arthur (who married three times, including lastly to Evelyn, Duchess of Wellington, the widow of Henry Wellesley, 3rd Duke of Wellington and sister to William's wife Emily).

His father was the eldest son of Henry Wellesley, 1st Baron Cowley, and Lady Charlotte Cadogan (daughter of Charles Cadogan, 1st Earl Cadogan). William was a grand-nephew of the 1st Duke of Wellington and the 1st Marquess Wellesley. His maternal grandparents were 20th Baroness de Ros and Lord Henry FitzGerald (fourth son of the 1st Duke of Leinster).

== Career ==
Wellesley was educated at Eton before becoming a Lieutenant in the Coldstream Guards in 1852. He was made a captain in 1854. He served in the Crimean War in 1855 and the Oudh campaign in India in 1858 for which he was awarded the Order of the Medjidie, 5th Class. From 1860 to 1863, he was Lt.-Col. of the Coldstream Guards.

In 1859, he was Military Secretary to Lord Elphinstone, the Governor of Bombay.

Upon the death of his father on 15 July 1884, he succeeded as 3rd Baron Cowley of Wellesley, 2nd Viscount Dangan, and 2nd Earl Cowley.

== Personal life ==
On 8 August 1863, Wellesley was married to Emily Gwendolen Peers-Williams (1839–1932), second daughter of Col. Thomas Peers Williams MP, of Temple House and the former Emily Bacon (daughter of Anthony Bushby Bacon of Benham Park). Together, they were the parents of:

- Henry Arthur Mornington Wellesley, 3rd Earl Cowley (1866–1919), who married Lady Violet Nevill, the daughter of William Nevill, 1st Marquess of Abergavenny and the former Caroline Vanden-Bempde-Johnstone (a daughter of Sir John Vanden-Bempde-Johnstone, 2nd Baronet).
- Lady Eva Cecilia Margaret Wellesley (d. 1948), who married, as his second wife, Randolph Gordon Erskine-Wemyss, eldest son of James Hay Erskine Wemyss MP, in 1898.

Lord Cowley died at Draycot House in Wiltshire on 28 February 1895, and was succeeded by his son, Henry. His widow died on 9 November 1932.

Peerage of the United Kingdom
Preceded by Henry Richard Charles Wellesley	Earl Cowley; 1884–1895	Succeeded by Henry Arthur Mornington Wellesley
