= John Carpenter, 4th Earl of Tyrconnell =

British peer

The Right Honourable The Earl of Tyrconnell GCH, FRS
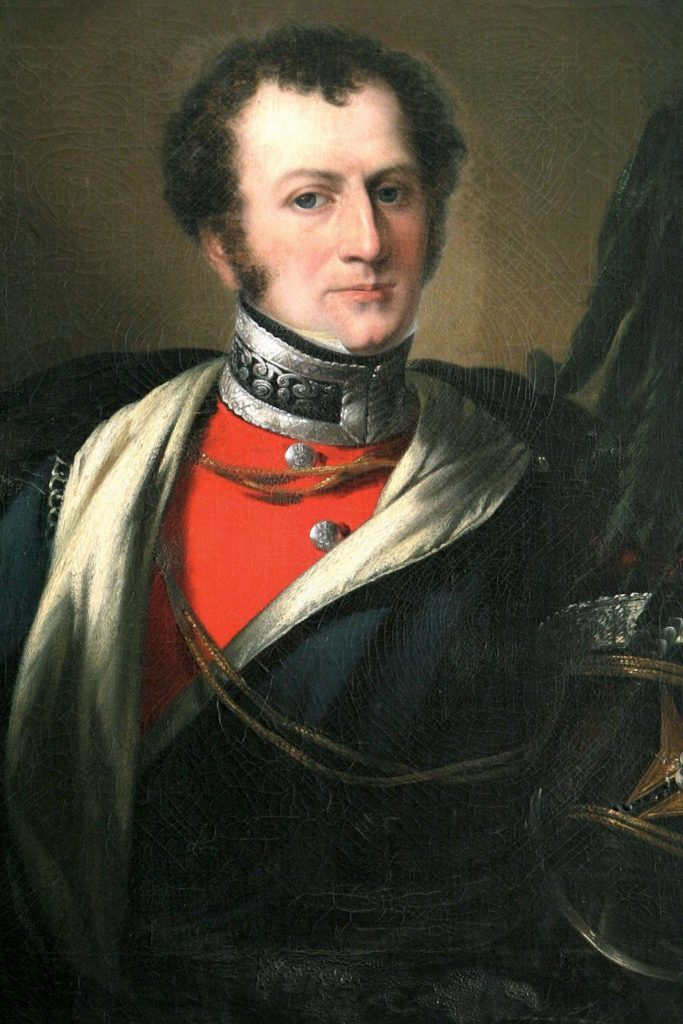
- A colour picture of an 1830s painting of the fourth Earl of Tyrconnell, in the scarlet uniform of the North York Corps of Yeomanry with a hunt green cap and helmet. Around his neck is a high leather neck guard.

Personal details
- Born: 16 December 1790 England
- Died: 25 June 1853 (aged 62) Kiplin Hall, North Yorkshire, England
- Spouse: Lady Sarah Crowe Carpenter

John Delaval Carpenter, 4th Earl of Tyrconnell GCH, FRS (16 December 1790 – 25 June 1853) was a British peer. He served with the North York Corps of Yeomanry.

== Background ==
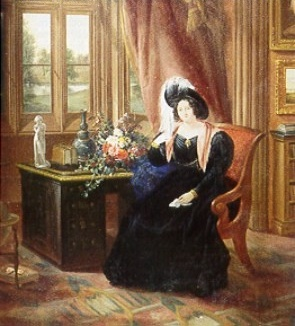
Sarah Carpenter, Lady Tyrconnell, in the Gothic Drawing Room of Kiplin Hall, 1833

Carpenter was the second son of Charles & Elizabeth (MacKenzie) Carpenter. His father Charles (3 January 1757 – 5 September 1803) was a naval officer of rank who married on 19 May 1785 the only daughter of Thomas Mackenzie, Esq. His uncle was George Carpenter, 2nd Earl of Tyrconnell who died 15 April 1805, leaving the title to John's older brother George. When George died on 20 December 1812, John inherited the title.

He married on 1 October 1817 Sarah Crowe (abt 1795 – 1868), the only child of Robert Crowe, Esq., of Kiplin, county York and Anne Buckle, his wife, who was the daughter of Christopher Buckle, Esq., of Burgh, in Banstead.

In 1818, Sarah Crowe Carpenter inherited Kiplin Hall from her father and lived there until her death in 1868. John and Sarah had only one child, a daughter named Elizabeth Anne Carpenter who was born and died on 19 February 1847.

Kiplin Hall passed to a cousin, Walter Cecil Talbot, second son of the Henry Chetwynd-Talbot, 18th Earl of Shrewsbury, who changed his surname to Carpenter as a condition of the will. From 1887 to 1904 Royal Navy Admiral Walter Talbot now surnamed Carpenter lived at Kiplin Hall, near Scorton, Richmond, North Yorkshire, England.

== Coat of arms ==
Lord Tyrconnell's arms, inherited by title from his great-great-great-grandfather Lord Carpenter, appear to be of French or Norman heritage, "Paly of six, argent and gules, on a chevron azure, 3 cross crosslets or." Crest, on a wreath a globe in a frame all or. Supporters, two horses, party-perfess, embattled argent and gules. Motto: "Per Acuta Belli" (Through the Asperities of War). These arms descend from John Carpenter, the younger (abt. 1372–1442), who was the noted Town Clerk of London during the reigns of King Henry V and King Henry VI.

These arms are often referred to as the Hereford Arms, named for the later ancestral home of the Carpenter Family in Hereford, England. The crest, supporters and motto apparently has changed several times over the centuries.

Sir William Boyd Carpenter (1841–1918), an English clergyman of the Established church of England, Bishop of Ripon, afterwards a Canon of Westminster and Chaplain to the reigning sovereign of England, wrote in a letter dated 7 August 1907 that his family bore the Hereford Arms. Sir Noel Paton, upon painting the family arms, informed him that the supporters were originally a round-handled sword, which in drawing over time became shortened, until nothing but the cross and globe were left beneath it. Those Hereford Arms were used by "John Carpenter, town clerk of London, who died 1442 A. D." His grandson John Boyd-Carpenter, Baron Boyd-Carpenter (1908–1998), continued the arms into the new century by passing it down to his son, Thomas Boyd-Carpenter, who was himself knighted after a military career as a lieutenant-general and for public service.

There is no direct male-to-male Carpenter descent connecting Lord Tyrconnell and Sir William Boyd Carpenter. The family connection is by marriage through the females in the family.

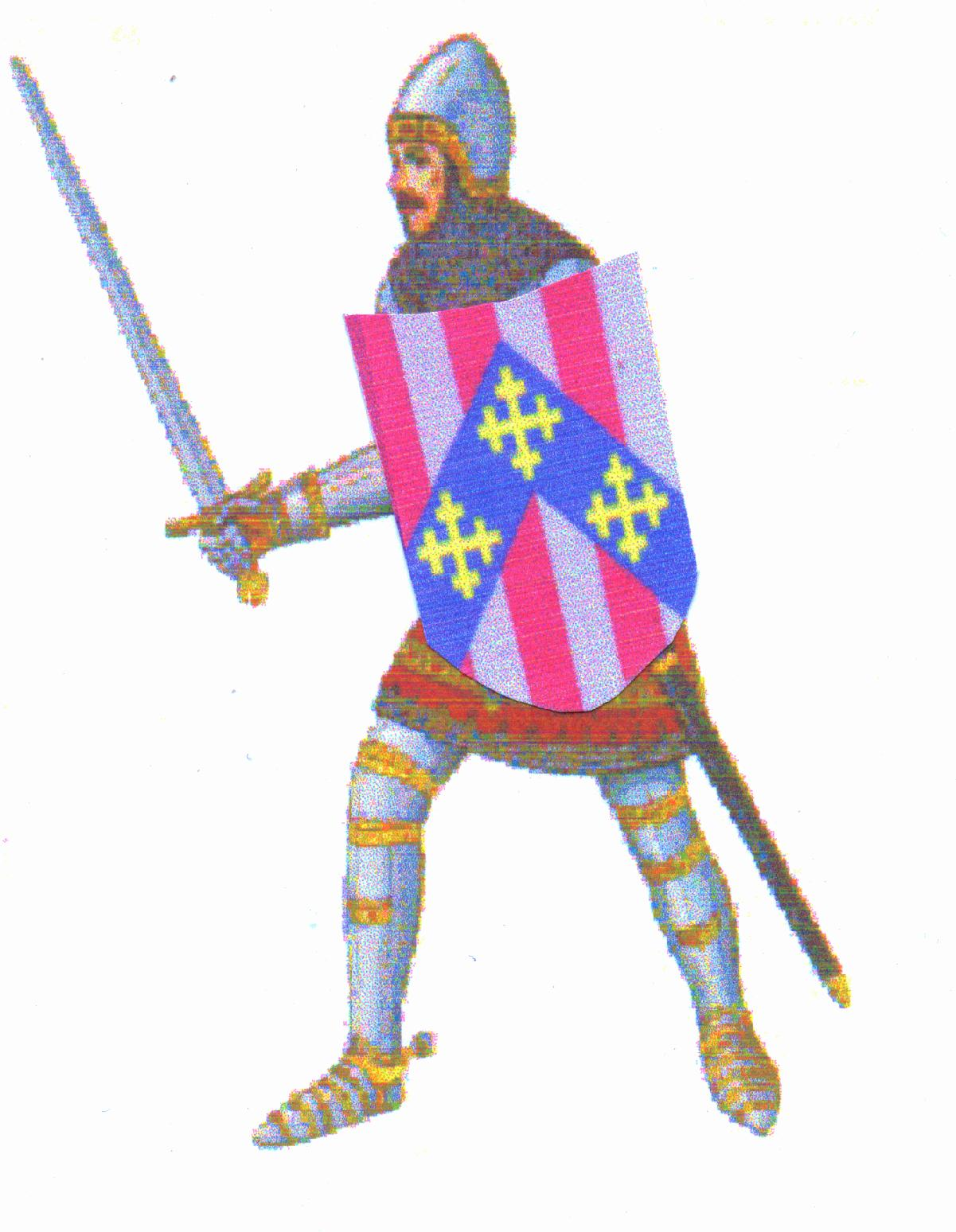
Sample of a medieval knight with an early Carpenter coat of arms on shield.

The Hereford coat of arms described above should not be confused with the arms of Bishop Richard Carpenter (c 1450s?–1503) presented in the "Visitations of the County of Oxford taken in 1566, 1574, and 1634, published in 1871, which describe the arms displayed in the buildings at the University in Oxford – "In the Lyberarye of Baliall College." – as recorded by the officials performing the visitations in those years. The Visitations describe the arms of Richard Carpenter (theologian) as: "Paly of nine Gu. and Az. on a chevron Arg. surmounted by a mitre Or, three cross crosslets of—nine pales alternating red and blue, with a silver chevron bearing three gold cross-crosslets.

Peerage of Ireland
Preceded by George Carpenter	Earl of Tyrconnell; 1812–1853	Extinct
