= George Webbe (cricketer, born 1854) =

English cricketer and British Army officer (1854–1925)

Personal information
- Full name: George Allan Webbe
- Born: 15 January 1854; Westminster, Middlesex, England
- Died: 19 February 1925 (aged 71); Ascot, Berkshire, England
- Batting: Right-handed
- Relatives: A. J. Webbe (brother); Herbert Webbe (brother)

Domestic team information
- Years: Team
- 1878: Marylebone Cricket Club

Career statistics
Competition	First-class
Matches	2
Runs scored	37
Batting average	18.50
100s/50s	–/–
Top score	19*
Catches/stumpings	–/–
- Source: Cricinfo, 25 April 2021

George Allan Webbe DL (15 January 1854 – 19 February 1925) was an English first-class cricketer and British Army officer.

The eldest son of Alexander Allan Webbe (1808-1868) and Marian Cutler (1825-1914), he was born at Westminster into a wealthy family that had long belonged to the colonial elite of Nevis. His father was a man of independent means, having inherited fortunes from both his uncle Josiah Webbe and from Sir Alexander Allan. He was educated at Harrow School, where he won the Public Schools' Rackets alongside Alexander Hadow in 1871 and 1872. Following his rackets success in 1872, Webbe became seriously ill which kept him out of the Harrow cricket eleven. From Harrow he went up to University College, Oxford but left after his freshman year to pursue a career in the British Army.

He was commissioned in the 15th King's Hussars as a sub-lieutenant in February 1874. In the same year that he joined The King's Hussars, Webbe played in a first-class cricket match for the Gentlemen of Marylebone Cricket Club against Kent at Canterbury, batting once in the match and scoring 9 runs before being dismissed by Edgar Willsher. He was promoted to lieutenant in The King's Hussars in September 1876, antedated to February 1874.

He made a second appearance in first-class cricket in 1878, for the Marylebone Cricket Club (MCC) against Kent at Canterbury, in which he batted twice and was dismissed in the MCC first innings for 9 runs by William Foord-Kelcey and was unbeaten in their second innings on 19. As a cricketer, he was described in Scores and Biographies as "a really good batsman, an energetic field at cover-point". Scores and Biographies speculated that if Webbe continued in the game that he would "perhaps excel". However, his 1878 appearance would be his last in first-class cricket.

He was aide-de-camp to the Inspector-General of Cavalry at Aldershot Garrison, Sir Frederick Fitzwygram, from 1879 to 1884. He gained the rank of captain in October 1882, with his retirement from active service following in March 1886. Webbe later served as a Deputy lieutenant of Aberdeen, to which he was appointed in March 1888.

Webbe died in February 1925 at his residence, Errollston House, in Ascot. His brothers Alexander Josiah and Herbert were also first-class cricketers. He was survived by his wife, Lady Cecilia Leila Hay, daughter of William Hay, 19th Earl of Erroll.
