= A. J. Webbe =

English cricketer

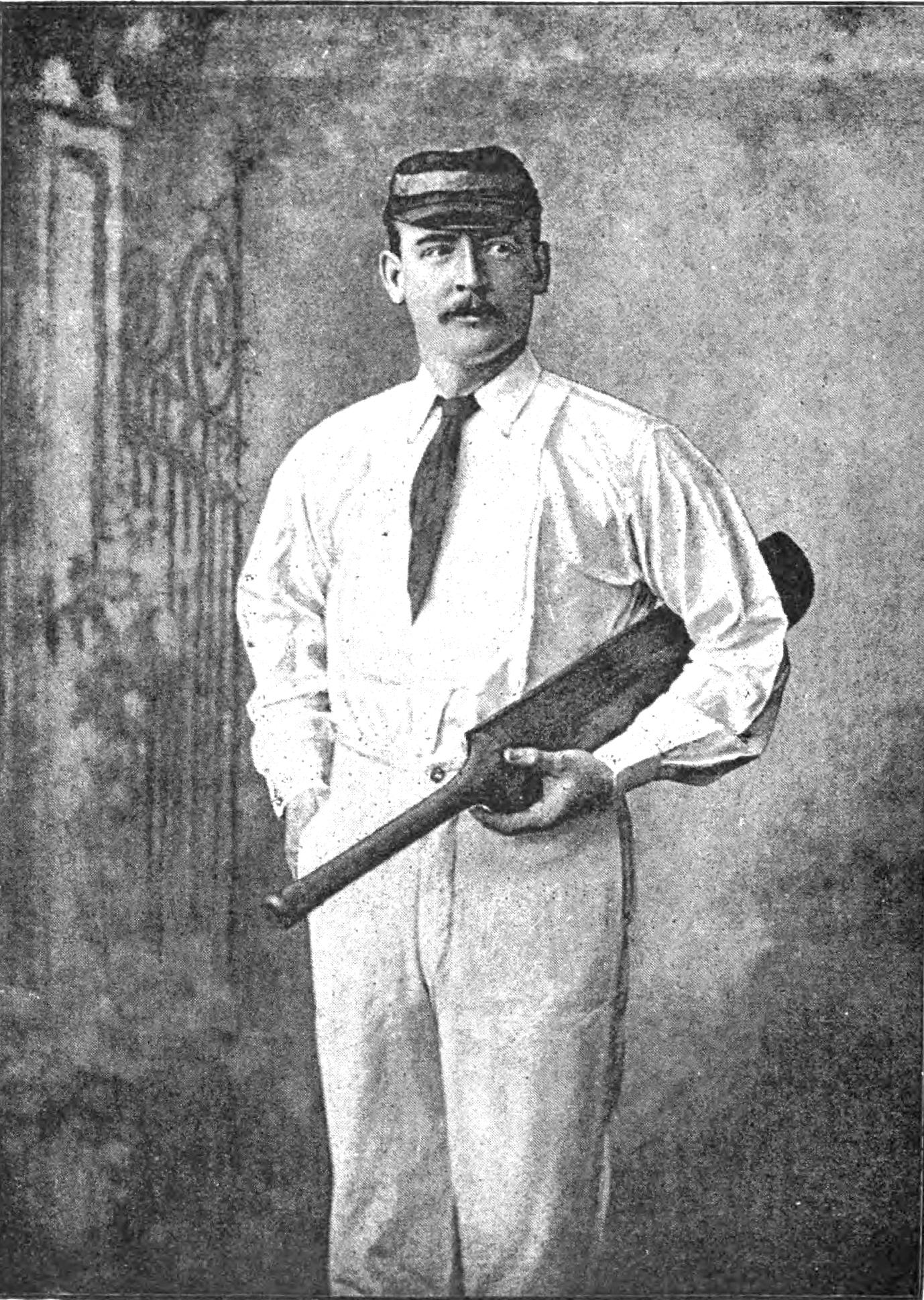

Personal information
- Born: 16 January 1855; Bethnal Green, London, England
- Died: 19 February 1941 (aged 86); Fulvens Farm, Hoe, Abinger Hammer, Surrey, England
- Height: 5 ft 8 in (1.73 m)
- Batting: Right-handed
- Bowling: Right-arm fast

International information
- National side: England
- Only Test (cap 20): 2 January 1879 v Australia

Career statistics
Competition	Test	First-class
Matches	1	370
Runs scored	4	14,465
Batting average	2.00	24.81
100s/50s	0/0	14/60
Top score	4	243*
Balls bowled	–	7,699
Wickets	–	109
Bowling average	–	25.21
5 wickets in innings	–	2
10 wickets in match	–	0
Best bowling	–	5/23
Catches/stumpings	2/0	229/10
- Source: CricInfo, 6 November 2022

Alexander Josiah Webbe (16 January 1855 – 19 February 1941) was a cricketer who played for Oxford University and Middlesex. He also played one test match for England.

Born into a wealthy family that had long belonged to the colonial elite of Nevis, Webbe was the second son of Alexander Allan Webbe (1809–1868), who had inherited fortunes from both his uncle Josiah Webbe and from Sir Alexander Allan, and of Marian Cutler (1825–1914), a granddaughter of the judge Sir Thomas Plumer. His brothers George and Herbert were also well-known cricketers. Through their mother, they were second cousins of General Plumer.

After being schooled at Harrow School, he went on to Trinity College, Oxford, where he got a Blue in his first year. He was twice captain of the university side. Whilst still at Oxford, Webbe played for the Gentlemen at Lord's and made 65 out of 203 in the opening stand, which he shared with WG Grace.

Webbe first played for Middlesex in his first year at University, aged only 20. In 1878–79 he was one of the amateurs to tour Australia with Lord Harris, and it was on this tour that he played in his one and only Test, scoring only 4 and 0.

Webbe was appointed captain of Middlesex in 1885, a post he held until 1898. His best season as a batsman was his third as captain, when in 1887 he scored 1,244 runs at an average of 47 and made 243 not out against Yorkshire.

After he retired as a cricketer, he was secretary of Middlesex from 1900 to 1922 and President of Middlesex from 1923 to 1936. From 1886 until 1909 he was a member of the committee of the Marylebone Cricket Club.

In 1884, Webbe became a Christian through Dwight L. Moody's preaching, after C. T. Studd invited him to attend Moody's campaign meeting.

He had married his first cousin Peroline Cutler, daughter of his uncle Edward Cutler QC, and had several children by her.

Sporting positions
Preceded by Isaac Walker	Middlesex County Cricket Captain; 1885–1898 (jointly with Andrew Stoddart 1898)	Succeeded by Gregor MacGregor
