= Edmund Phipps (British Army officer) =

British Member of Parliament and Army officer (1760–1837)

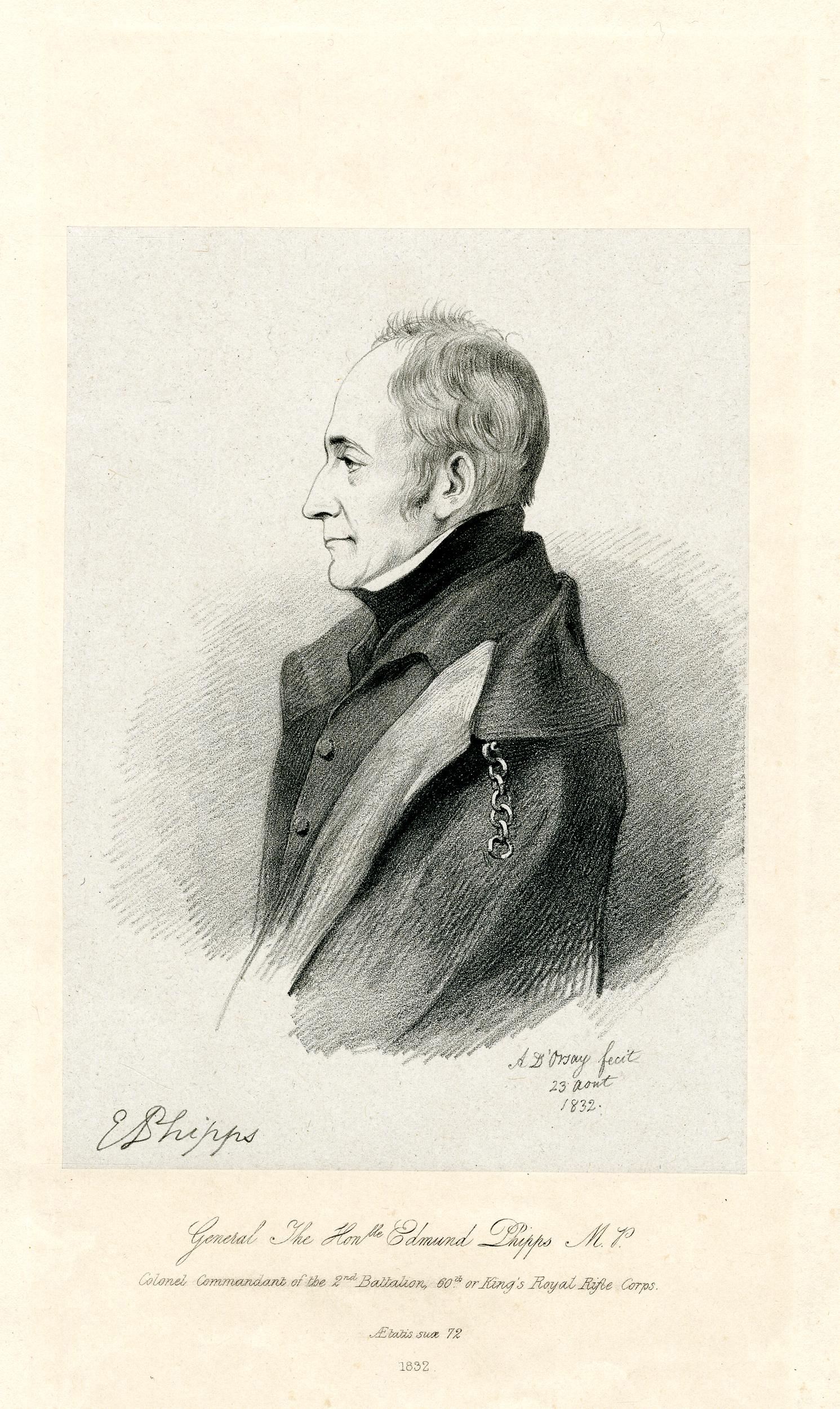
Edmund Phipps

General Edmund Phipps (7 April 1760 – 14 September 1837) was a senior British Army officer and Member of Parliament.

He was born in London, the fourth son of Constantine Phipps, 1st Baron Mulgrave and was the younger brother of Constantine John Phipps, 2nd Baron Mulgrave, Hon. Charles Phipps and Henry Phipps, 1st Earl of Mulgrave. He was educated at Eton College (1771–73) and St John's College, Cambridge (1778–80).

He entered the Army in 1780 as an ensign in the 85th Regiment of Foot, became a lieutenant in the 88th Foot and then a captain in the 93rd Foot. In 1782 he was appointed aide-de-camp to the Governor of Gibraltar. He transferred as a captain to the 1st Foot Guards and was a.d.c. to the Lord Lieutenant of Ireland from 1784 to 1787. He was promoted brevet-colonel in 1796, major-general in 1801 and lieutenant-general in 1808. In 1807 he was appointed colonel-commandant of both the 2nd and 3rd battalions of the 60th (Royal American) Regiment of Foot (later the Kings Royal Rifle Corps), a position he held until his death. He was made full general on 12 August 1819.

He also held the positions of Paymaster and Inspector-General of the Marines (1810–1812) and Clerk of the Deliveries of the Ordnance (1812–30).

When his elder brother was elevated to the peerage he inherited his Parliamentary seat for Scarborough, holding the seat himself from 1794 to 1818. He was subsequently elected to represent Queenborough from 1818 to 1820 and Scarborough again from 1820 to 1832.

He died unmarried in 1837 in Venice.

Parliament of the United Kingdom
Preceded by Hon. Henry Phipps; Earl of Tyrconnell	Member of Parliament for Scarborough; 1794–1818; With: Earl of Tyrconnell 1794–1796; Lord Charles Somerset 1796–1802; Lord Robert Manners 1802–1806; Charles Manners-Sutton 1806–1818	Succeeded by Charles Manners-Sutton; Viscount Normanby
Preceded by Robert Moorsom; Sir John Osborn, Bt	Member of Parliament for Queenborough; 1818–1820; With: Robert Moorsom	Succeeded by Hon. John Villiers; George Peter Holford
Preceded by Charles Manners-Sutton; Viscount Normanby	Member of Parliament for Scarborough; 1820–1832; With: Charles Manners-Sutton	Succeeded by Sir John Vanden-Bempde-Johnstone, Bt; Sir George Cayley, Bt
