= The Contrast (novel) =

1832 novel

- Author: Lord Normanby
- Language: English
- Genre: Silver Fork
- Publisher: Henry Colburn
- Publication date: 1832
- Publication place: United Kingdom
- Media type: Print

The Contrast is an 1832 novel by the British writer and politician Lord Normanby, originally published in three volumes. It was his third novel following Matilda (1825) and Yes and No (1828), all three of which were part of the developing silver fork genre focused on the fashionable aristocracy and upper classes of the late Regency period. It was written at the time of the Reform Act and examines the mixing of relationships across classes.

== Synopsis ==
Lord Castleton is in love with Lady Gertrude, but is separated from her by the plot of a fortune hunter. While in the North of England he falls in love on the rebound with a country girl, Lucy Darnell and marries her. However, when he brings her back to London he finds her plain ways and accent an embarrassment, while she is very uncomfortable in high society. The kindly Gertrude befriends her and tries to assist her integration in London fashion. When Gertrude realises that she and Castleton still have strong feelings for each other, she leaves for Continental Europe to avoid temptation and scandal. Lucy then tragically drowns while visiting her relatives in the north, opening the way for the potential return of Gertrude and marriage to Castleton some time in the future.

== Bibliography ==
- Adburgham, Alison. Silver Fork Society: Fashionable Life and Literature from 1814 to 1840. Faber & Faber, 2012.
- Copeland, Edward. The Silver Fork Novel: Fashionable Fiction in the Age of Reform. Cambridge University Press, 2012.
- Hopkins, Lisa (ed.) After Austen: Reinventions, Rewritings, Revisitings. Springer, 2018.
