= George Carpenter, 2nd Earl of Tyrconnell =

Irish Earl

The Right Honourable The Earl of Tyrconnell

Personal details
- Born: 1750 Herefordshire, England
- Died: 15 April 1805 (aged 54–55)
- Spouse(s): Lady Frances Manners (dissolved); Lady Sarah Hussey
- Parent(s): George Carpenter, 1st Earl of Tyrconnell; Lady Frances Clifton

George Carpenter, 2nd Earl of Tyrconnell (1750 – 15 April 1805), styled The Honourable George Carpenter until 1761 and Viscount Carlingford between 1761 and 1762, was a British politician who sat in the House of Commons for 30 years from 1772 to 1802.

== Background ==
Carpenter was the eldest son of George Carpenter, 1st Earl of Tyrconnell by his wife Frances (née Clifton), of Herefordshire, England. He became known by the courtesy title Viscount Carlingford when his father was elevated to an earldom in 1761. He succeeded in the earldom already the following year on the death of his father. This was an Irish peerage and did not entitle him to a seat in the British House of Lords although it did entitle him to a seat in the Irish House of Lords.

== Family ==
Lord Tyrconnell married firstly on 9 July 1772, Frances Manners, the eldest daughter of the military commander John Manners, Marquess of Granby, and granddaughter of John Manners, 3rd Duke of Rutland. This marriage was dissolved by act of parliament in October 1777 and the Lady later married Phillip Anstruther, Esq.

Tyrconnell married secondly, on 3 June 1780, Sarah Hussey Delaval, the youngest daughter and co-heir of John Delaval, 1st Baron Delaval. They had one child;

- Lady Susan Hussey Carpenter (abt 1784–1827), who married Henry Beresford, 2nd Marquess of Waterford.

== Political career ==
Lord Tyrconnell was elected Member of Parliament for Scarborough on 28 July 1772, a seat he held until 1796, when he was returned for Berwick-upon-Tweed. He continued to represent this constituency until 1802. Despite his difficulty in marriage, he owed his seats in Parliament to his former wives. Before 1790 he attended regularly and silently followed the Rutland line in politics. He supported William Pitt's administration because The Duke of York's conduct towards Lady Tyrconnell that was alleged by Sir Gilbert Elliot.

Tyrconnell voted for Richmond's fortifications plan on 27 February 1786, and with Pitt over the Regency in 1788 and 1789. In May 1787, when the question of the Prince of Wales debts was brought before Parliament, Pulteney informed Tyrconnell about the letter he had received from Rutland, and Carpenter voted accordingly 'for the Prince.' In April 1791 Carpenter was listed as "hostile" to the repeal of the Test Act in Scotland, On 29 May 1791 he renewed an application to Pitt to place his sister, Lady Almeria Carpenter, on the pension list, in view of her "scanty income." He made no mark in that Parliament, except for his pleas for a fair hearing for John Fenton Cawthorne who was threatened with expulsion 25 April 1796. The Duchess of Rutland made clear that he would not be again nominated at Scarborough for 1796.

In 1796 he ran unopposed as an MP for Berwick-upon-Tweed. By 1799 he had resolved not to stand again at Berwick, and he left no further evidence of Parliamentary activity and retired in 1802 from public life.

== Later life ==
Lord Tyrconnell died on 15 April 1805. He was succeeded by his nephew, George, the son of Charles Carpenter, became the 3rd Earl of Tyrconnell.

== Coat of arms ==
Lord Tyrconnell's Arms appears to be of French or Norman heritage, "Paly of six, argent and gules, on a chevron azure, 3 cross crosslets or." Crest, on a wreath a globe in a frame all or. Supporters, two horses, party-perfess, embattled argent and gules. Motto: "Per Acuta Belli" (Through the Asperities of War). These arms descend from John Carpenter, the younger (abt. 1372 – 1442) who was the noted Town Clerk of London during the reigns of King Henry V & King Henry VI.

These Arms are often referred to as the Hereford Arms, named for the later ancestral home of the Carpenter Family in Hereford, England. The Crest, supporters & motto apparently has changed several times over the centuries.

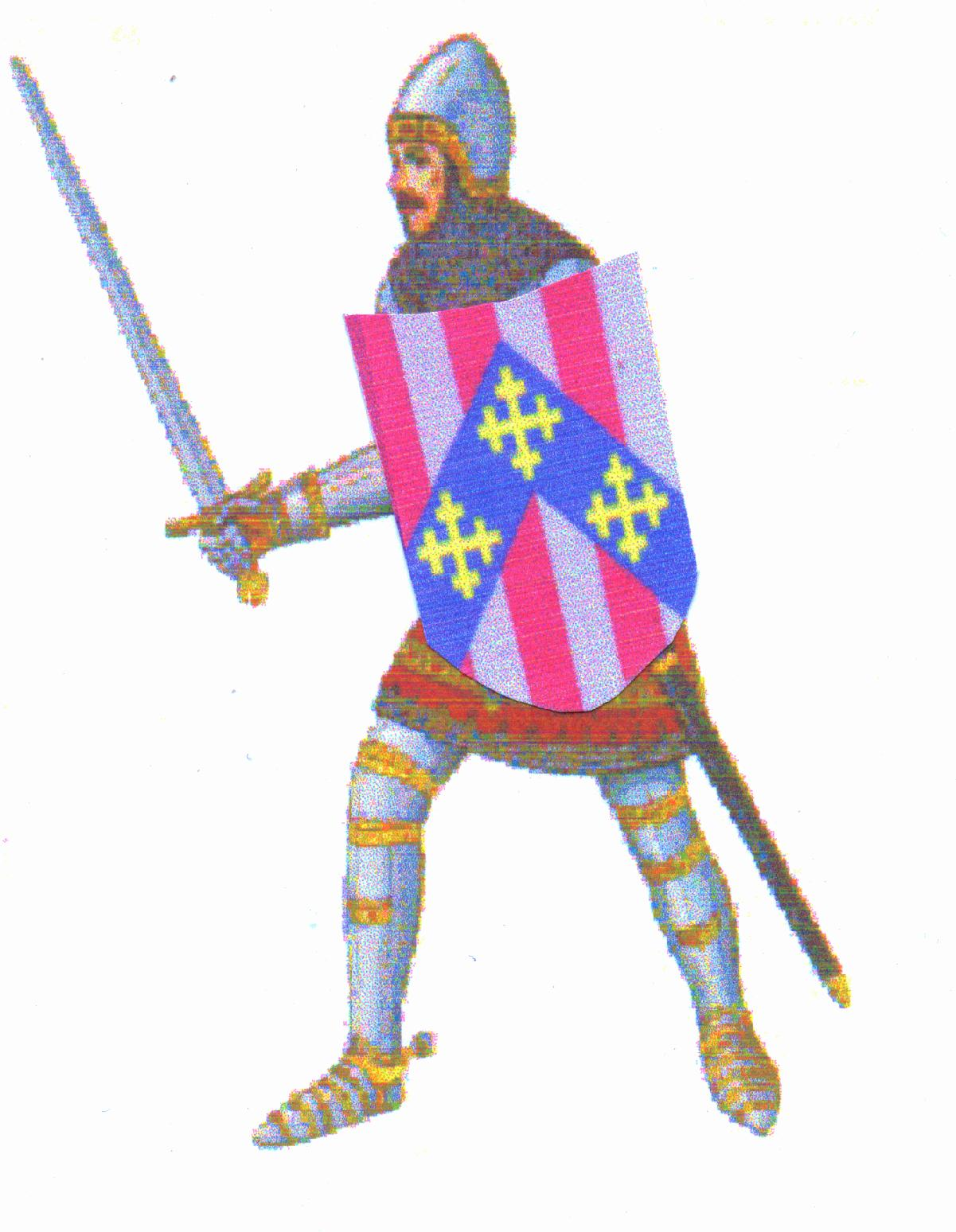
Sample of a medieval knight with an early Carpenter Coat of Arms on shield.

Sir William Boyd Carpenter (1841–1918), an English clergyman of the Established church of England, Bishop of Ripon, afterwards a Canon of Westminster and Chaplain to the reigning sovereign of England, wrote in a letter dated 7 August 1907 that his family bore the Hereford Arms. Sir Noel Paton, upon painting the Family Arms, informed him that the supporters were originally a round-handled sword, which in drawing over time became shortened, until nothing but the cross and globe were left beneath it. Those Hereford Arms were used by "John Carpenter, town clerk of London, who died 1442 A. D." His grandson John Boyd-Carpenter, Baron Boyd-Carpenter (1908–1998), continued the Arms into the new century by passing it down to his son, Thomas Boyd-Carpenter, who was himself knighted after a military career as a Lieutenant-General and for public service. There is no direct male to male Carpenter descent connecting Lord George Carpenter & Sir William Boyd Carpenter. The family connection is by marriage through the females in the family.

The Hereford Coat of Arms described above should not be confused with the Arms of Bishop Richard Carpenter (c1450s?–1503) presented in the "Visitations of the County of Oxford taken in 1566, 1574, and 1634, published in 1871, which describe the arms displayed in the buildings at the University in Oxford – "In the Lyberarye of Baliall College." – as recorded by the officials performing the visitations in those years. The Visitations describe the arms of Richard Carpenter (theologian) as: "Paly of nine Gu. and Az. on a chevron Arg. surmounted by a mitre Or, three cross crosslets of—nine pales alternating red and blue, with a silver chevron bearing three gold cross-crosslets.

Parliament of Great Britain
| Preceded by George Manners; Sir James Pennyman, Bt | Member of Parliament for Scarborough; 1772–1796; With: Sir James Pennyman, Bt 1772–1774; Sir Hugh Palliser, Bt 1774–1779; Charles Phipps 1779–1784; George Osbaldeston 1784–1790; Hon. Henry Phipps 1790–1794; Hon. Edmund Phipps 1794–1796 | Succeeded by Hon. Edmund Phipps; Lord Charles Somerset |
| Preceded by Hon. Charles Carpenter; John Callender | Member of Parliament for Berwick-upon-Tweed; 1796–1801; With: John Callender | Succeeded by Parliament of the United Kingdom |
Parliament of the United Kingdom
| Preceded by Parliament of Great Britain | Member of Parliament for Berwick-upon-Tweed; 1801–1802; With: John Callender | Succeeded by Thomas Hall; John Fordyce |
Peerage of Ireland
| Preceded by George Carpenter | Earl of Tyrconnell; 1762–1805 | Succeeded by George Carpenter |
