= Charles Phipps (Royal Navy officer) =

Royal Navy officer during the American War of Independence, and an MP (1753–1786)

Captain The Honourable Charles Phipps
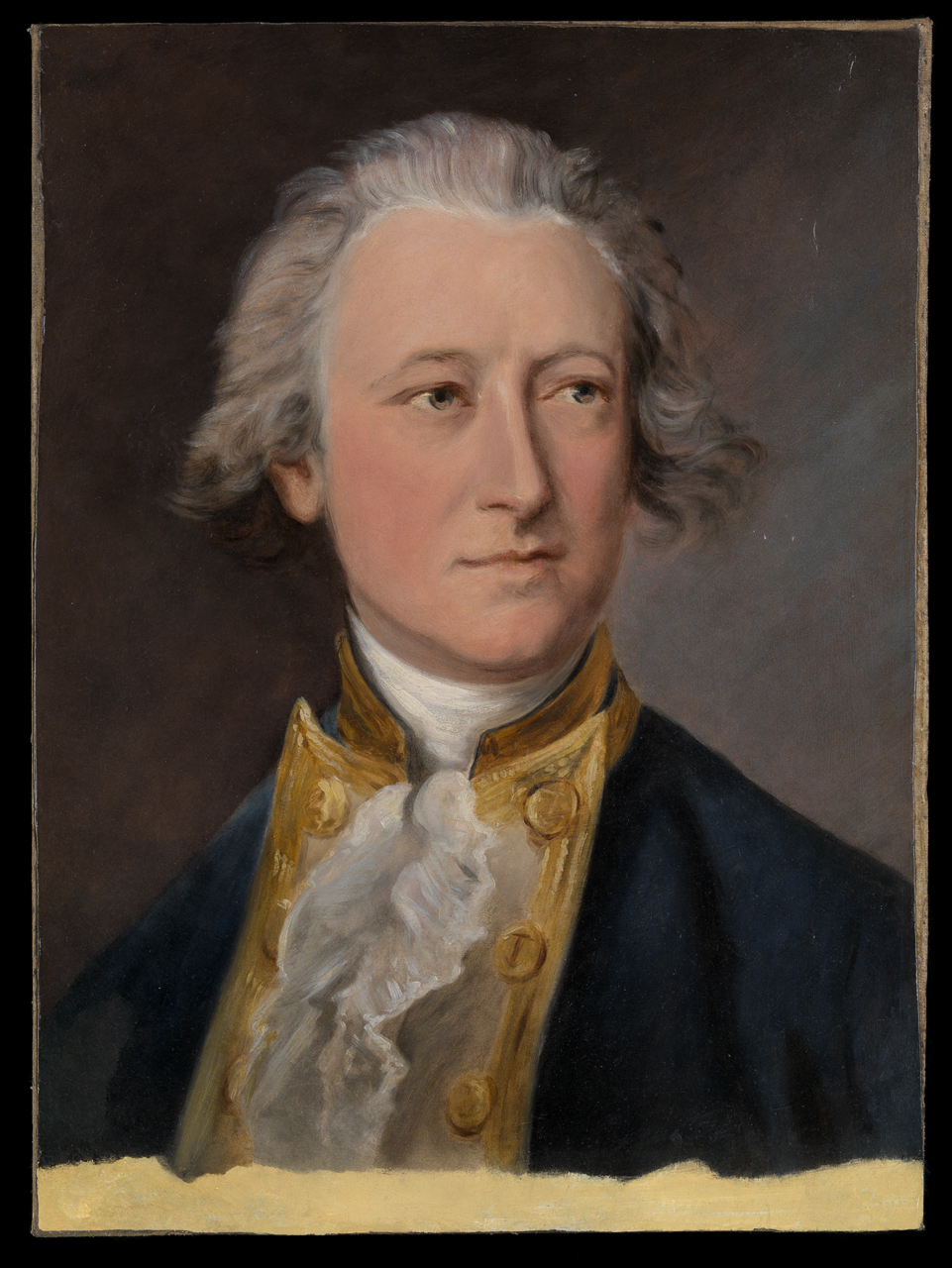
- The Hon. Charles Phipps, attributed to Thomas Gainsborough
- Born: 10 December 1753
- Died: 20 October 1786 (aged 32); Mulgrave Castle, Yorkshire
- Relatives: Constantine Phipps (father); Henry Phipps (brother); Constantine Phipps (brother)
- Military career
- Allegiance: Kingdom of Great Britain
- Branch: Royal Navy
- Rank: Captain
- Units: HMS Strombolo; HMS Perseus; HMS Camilla; HMS Ariel; HMS Ambuscade; HMS Monsieur; HMS Berwick
- Conflicts: American War of Independence; First Relief of Gibraltar; Second Relief of Gibraltar; Battle of Cape Spartel

Charles Phipps (10 December 1753 – 20 October 1786) was an officer in the Royal Navy. He served during the American War of Independence, seeing action in a number of battles and engagements. He also went on to have a career in Parliament sitting in the House of Commons from 1779 to 1786.

Born into a family with naval and parliamentary connections, Phipps integrated them both into a short career. He promoted to his first commands during the American War of Independence, commanding a range of small ships off the North American coast and being active against American shipping. He spent the later part of the wars in European waters, commanding frigates, and supporting the fleets. He took part in the first relief of Gibraltar in 1781, and the second in 1782. By then he was captain of a 74-gun ship of the line. He retired ashore after the war, and having embarked on a political career, represented both Scarborough and Minehead before his death at a relatively young age, in 1786.

== Family and early life ==
Charles Phipps was born on 10 December 1753, the second son of Constantine Phipps, 1st Baron Mulgrave and his wife Lepell. His elder brother, Constantine, and his younger brother, Henry, both went on to be politicians, with Constantine also serving as a naval officer. Charles Phipps also entered the navy, and after seeing some service, was promoted to lieutenant on 19 January 1771. He is first recorded as having commissioned the fireship HMS Strombolo in February 1776, and having sailed for North America in May that year.^{[a]} The American War of Independence was being fought at this time, and after brief service on the station, Phipps was promoted to post-captain on 1 August 1776. His first command at this level was to temporarily take over the 20-gun HMS Perseus, succeeding her regular captain, George Elphinstone, from August that year.

Phipps moved to take command of the 20-gun HMS Camilla on 21 May 1777, remaining her captain into 1778. Camilla remained off the North American coast during this time, and Phipps's next command, the 20-gun HMS Ariel was also based on the North American station. Phipps commissioned her in September 1778 and was active against American shipping, capturing the privateer New Broom on 22 October 1778. Phipps was replaced as captain in February 1779 by Thomas Mackenzie, and in April that year commissioned the 32-gun HMS Ambuscade. Ambuscade was active in European waters, and Phipps enjoyed successes against French privateers, capturing the Prince de Montbarry on 28 June, and the 16-gun Hélène on 23 July 1779. Phipps took part in the relief of Guernsey in September 1779, and then served in John Reynold's squadron in October. From there he moved to the Channel Fleet in 1780, which was then commanded by Sir Francis Geary, and on 4 July that year captured the privateer Eleonore.

== Later commands ==
Phipps was then given command of the newly captured 36-gun HMS Monsieur in July 1780. Monsieur completed fitting out at Portsmouth in October 1780, and Phipps soon scored his first success with her, capturing the 20-gun Chevreuil on 15 December. He next commanded her at the relief of Gibraltar in 1781 with George Darby's fleet, and on 10 October that year assisted HMS Minerva in capturing the French 22-gun ship Jason off Cape Clear. His final command was the 74-gun HMS Berwick, which he took over in March 1782. Berwick served as part of Lord Howe's fleet for the third and final relief of Gibraltar in late 1782, and was in action at the Battle of Cape Spartel on 20 October 1782. She then sailed to the West Indies with Sir Richard Hughes's fleet, and arrived there in December. Berwick was paid off in June 1783, after the end of the American War of Independence, and Phipps went ashore, apparently having no further seagoing commands.

== Political career ==
Phipps had embarked on a political career during the American War of Independence, and had been elected MP for Scarborough on 27 February 1779, succeeding another naval officer, Sir Hugh Palliser. Phipps owed his election to the Admiralty interest in the constituency, and Palliser's support. Like his brother, Constantine, Charles was initially a supporter of the North Ministry, but his naval duties often kept him away from parliament. Constantine and Charles both abandoned the North Ministry after 1784, supporting William Pitt the Younger, but though Charles contested Scarborough again in 1784, he was defeated. Another seat was found for him in June 1784, and he was elected to Minehead, which he represented until his death. Phipps died unmarried at the family seat, Mulgrave Castle, Yorkshire, on 20 October 1786.

== Notes ==
a. Strombolo was a former 14-gun sloop, launched in 1746 as HMS Grampus. She was converted to a fireship in 1762 and was renamed in 1771.

== Citations ==
Parliament of Great Britain
Preceded by Sir Hugh Palliser, Bt; The Earl of Tyrconnel	Member of Parliament for Scarborough; 1779–1784; With: The Earl of Tyrconnel	Succeeded by The Earl of Tyrconnel; George Osbaldeston
Preceded by Henry Beaufoy; John Fownes Luttrell	Member of Parliament for Minehead; 1784–1786; With: John Fownes Luttrell	Succeeded by Robert Wood; John Fownes Luttrell
