= George the Elder =

George the Elder may refer to:

- George Bickham the Elder (1684–1758), English writing master and engraver
- George Dance the Elder (1695–1768), English architect
- George Adams (scientist, died 1772) (c. 1709–1772), English instrument maker and science writer
- George Colman the Elder (1732–1794), English dramatist and essayist
- George Cuitt the Elder (1743–1818), English painter
- George Osbaldeston the elder (c. 1753–1793), English landowner and politician
- George H. W. Bush (1924–2018), also known as George Bush the Elder, American politician
