= HMS Monsieur (1780) =

Frigate of the Royal Navy

History

France
- Name: Monsieur
- Owner: Messrs. Laforterie-Valmont, Deslandes, and Leboucher de Vallefleur
- Builder: Le Havre
- Laid down: July 1778
- Launched: 1779
- Fate: Captured 1780

Great Britain
- Name: HMS Monsieur
- Operator: Royal Navy
- In service: 1780
- Out of service: 1783
- Fate: Sold 1783

General characteristics
- Class & type: frigate
- Tons burthen: 818 75/94 (bm)
- Length: 139 ft 2 1/4 in (42.424 m) (gundeck); 115 ft 3 3/8 in (35.138 m) (keel)
- Beam: 36 ft 6 1/2 in (11.138 m)
- Depth of hold: 17 ft 9 1/2 in (5.423 m)
- Propulsion: Sail
- Complement: Privateer: 398 British service: 255 (from 21 December 1780)
- Armament: Privateer: Gun deck: 26 × 12-pounder guns; QD & Fc: 14 × 6-pounder guns; British service: Upper deck: 26 × 12-pounder guns; QD: 8 × 6-pounder guns; Fc: 2 × 6-pounder guns

HMS Monsieur was the former 40-gun French privateer Monsieur, built at Le Havre between July 1778 and 1779, then armed at Granville. The Royal Navy captured her in 1780 and subsequently put her into service as a 36-gun Fifth Rate. This frigate was sold in 1783.

== Privateer ==
From August 1779 to March 1780, Nicholas Guidelou was her captain. On her first cruise, in the space of four months, he captured 28 prizes off the English and Irish coasts. Only three of his prizes were retaken, and he brought into port 543 prisoners and 120 cannon. King Louis XVI honoured Guidelou with a sword and a letter of thanks.

On 28 March 1779, Monsieur captured the Scots letter of marque Leveller, off the harbour of Cork. Two days later, five leagues off Cape Clear, Monsieur captured the Polly, sailing for Liverpool. After Polly was ransomed for 1250 guineas, the privateer let her continue her journey. The next day, 1 April, another French privateer fired at Polly, but she was able to take refuge in the port of Skibbereen

On 14 August 1779 John Paul Jones led a small squadron consisting of Bon Homme Richard, Alliance, Pallas, Vengeance, Cerf, and two privateers, Monsieur and Granville, out of Groa. On 18 August they recaptured the Dutch vessel Verwagting, which an English privateer had captured eight days earlier. She had been carrying brandy and wine from Barcelona to Dunkirk. During the night Monsieur's captain took what he wanted from the prize, and then sent her off to Ostend under his name and with his prize crew. Jones overhauled the prize, put his own prize crew aboard, and sent her off to Lorient under his orders. The next evening Monsieur left Jones's squadron. Granville left either at the same time or soon thereafter.

On 22 January 1780, the Lively was sailing from London to Liverpool when she fell victim to the Irish pirate vessel Black Prince. Lively escaped only to fall victim to Monsieur two days later. Monsieur took all the crew out of Lively, except for three boys, and put a 13-man prize crew aboard. On 4 February, the boys recaptured the ship while almost the entire prize crew was asleep. The next day they sailed to Kinsale where the letter of marque Hercules took possession.

== Capture ==
On 12 March 1780 the Third Rate Alexander, under the command of Captain Lord Longford, was west of Scilly when she spotted a frigate. Alexander gave chase and after 18 hours got within range, at which time the quarry raised French colours. The two vessels exchanged fire for some two hours, the quarry using stern chasers to answer Alexander's bow chasers. As Alexander pulled alongside the quarry, Alexander's fore-top-mast simply fell over due to rot. Fortunately, Courageux, Captain Charles Fielding, had joined the engagement and she took up the chase. Some time and some firing later, the quarry struck. She turned out to be the Monsieur, of Granville, under the command of Jean de Bochet. She was armed with 40 guns, 12-pounders on the gundeck and 6-pounders on the quarterdeck and forecastle, and had a crew of 362 men. She was eight days out of Lorient but had taken no prizes. Longford described her as "a very fine frigate, almost new".

== British service ==
The prize was brought into Portsmouth harbour on 19 March, a week after her capture, and the Admiralty decided to take her into service. She was refitted for Royal Naval service at a cost of £8,364 between May and October 1780, and re-armed as a 36-gun frigate.

The Royal Navy commissioned her as HMS Monsieur under the command of Captain the Honourable Charles Phipps in July 1780. On 10 December, Monsieur, in company with Vestal, St Albans, Portland, and Solebay captured Comtess de Buzancois. A few days later, on 15 December, Monsieur captured the French cutter Chevreuil. Chevreuil, of Saint-Malo, was armed with twenty 6-pounder guns, had a crew of 116 men, and had been launched on 1 March 1779.

In 1781, Monsieur, now commanded by Captain the Honourable Seymour Finch, was serving with Vice-Admiral Darby's Channel Fleet. She therefore participated in the relief of Gibraltar, with the fleet sailing from Spithead on 13 March and arriving at Gibraltar on 12 April. At some point, vessels of the fleet engaged Spanish gunboats off Cadiz, during which Monsieur and Minerva had some men badly wounded. Monsieur was among the many ships of Darby's fleet that shared in the prize money for the capture of Duc de Chartres, the Spanish frigate Santa Leocadia, and the French brig Trois Amis.

On 9 October 1781, Monsieur, Minerva, Captain Charles Fielding, Flora and Crocodile] captured the American privateer Hercules, of 20 guns and 120 men. The next day Minerva and Monsieur captured the American privateer Jason, of 22 guns. Minerva captured the privateer Wexford, which was six weeks out of Boston and had captured nothing. All three privateers were taken off Cape Clear Island, Ireland, and taken into Cork.

On 12 December at the Second Battle of Ushant, Admiral Richard Kempenfelt captured 15 French transports. Monsieur was among the many vessels that shared in the prize money for the Emille Sophie de Brest and the Margueritte, and presumably other prizes.

In the middle of July 1782, Monsieur was in a squadron of four third rates and three frigates under the command of Captain Reeve, in the recently launched Crown, as commodore. In the Bay of Biscay the squadron captured three prizes: the Pigmy cutter, the Hermione, a victualler with 90 bullocks for the combined fleet, and a brig carrying salt.

== Fate ==
Following the conclusion of the war, Monsieur was paid off at Deptford in March 1783. She was sold for £820 on 25 September of that year.
