= George Carpenter, 3rd Earl of Tyrconnell =

Irish nobleman and politician

The Right Honourable The Earl of Tyrconnell

Personal details
- Born: 1788 England
- Died: 20 December 1812 (aged 23–24) Wilna, Russia (now Vilnius, Lithuania)

George Carpenter, 3rd Earl of Tyrconnell (1788 – 20 December 1812), known as George Carpenter until 1805, was a British peer and soldier who died fighting the French forces led by Napoleon Bonaparte at Wilna (Vilnius), in then Russian Empire.

== Background ==
Carpenter was the eldest son of the Honourable Charles Carpenter (3 January 1757 – 5 September 1803), a naval officer and MP for Berwick-upon-Tweed, and Elizabeth, the only daughter of Thomas Mackenzie. He inherited his earldom from his uncle, George Carpenter, 2nd Earl of Tyrconnell, who died on 15 April 1805. He was educated at St John's College, Cambridge.

== Career ==
Lord Tyrconnell became an officer for the British Crown. He volunteered in the summer of 1812 to serve as an officer under Alexander I of Russia, and served under Admiral Pavel Vasilyevich Chichagov. While opposing the French forces of Napoleon he died of disease as "his zeal and desire to see every transaction of that army led him to expose himself to cold and fatigue beyond his strength." Upon his death his brother John became the 4th Earl of Tyrconnell.

== Coat of arms ==
Lord Tyrconnell's Arms appear to be of French or Norman heritage, "Paly of six, argent and gules, on a chevron azure, 3 cross crosslets or." Crest, on a wreath a globe in a frame all or. Supporters, two horses, party-perfess, embattled argent and gules. Motto: "Per Acuta Belli" (Through the Asperities of War). These arms descend from John Carpenter, the younger (abt. 1372 – 1442) who was the noted Town Clerk of London during the reigns of King Henry V & King Henry VI.

These Arms are often referred to as the Hereford Arms, named for the later ancestral home of the Carpenter Family in Hereford, England. The Crest, supporters & motto apparently has changed several times over the centuries.

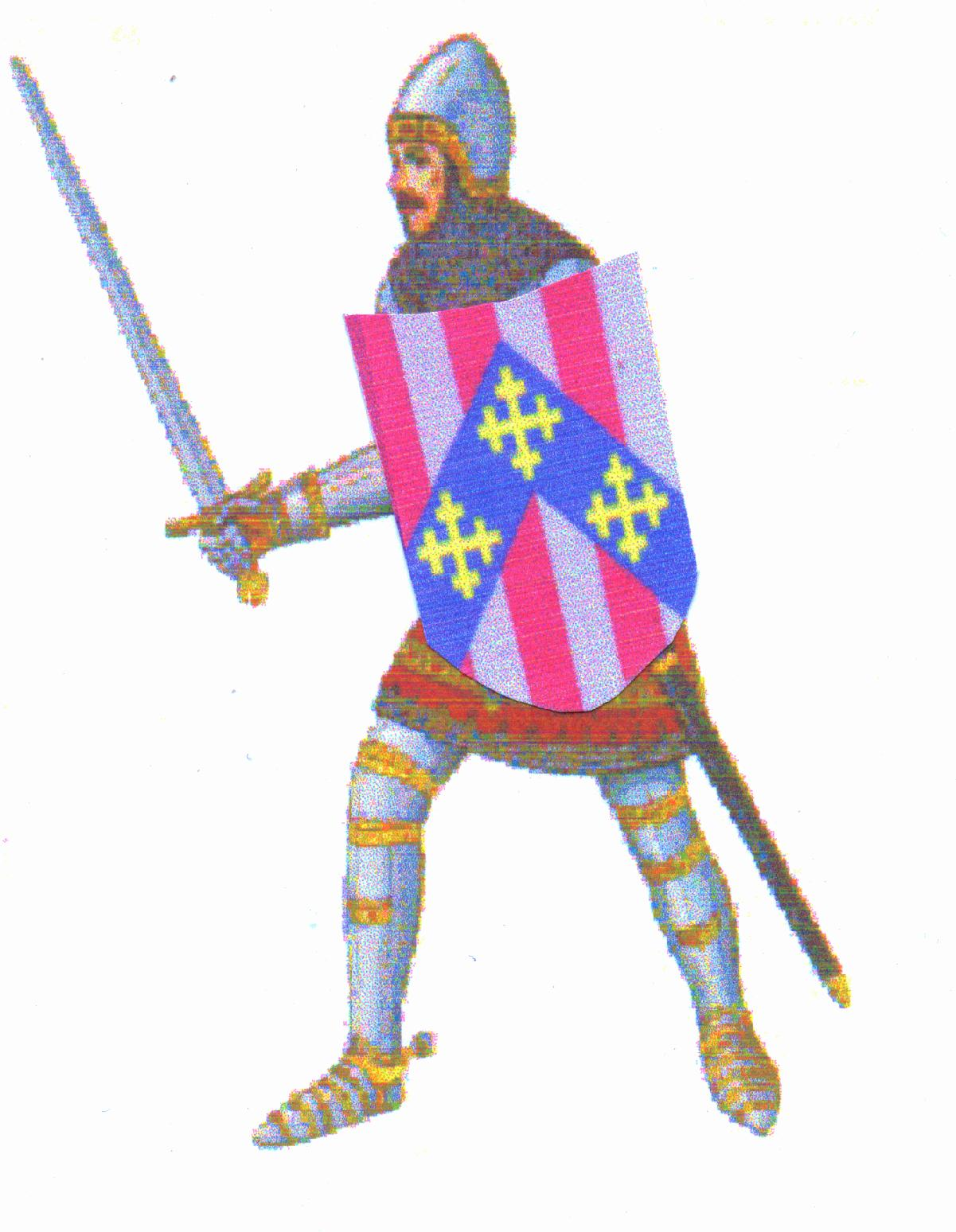
Sample of a medieval knight with an early Carpenter Coat of Arms on shield.

Sir William Boyd Carpenter (1841 – 1918), an English clergyman of the Established church of England, Bishop of Ripon, afterwards a Canon of Westminster and Chaplain to the reigning sovereign of England, wrote in a letter dated 7 August 1907 that his family bore the Hereford Arms. Sir Noel Paton, upon painting the Family Arms, informed him that the supporters were originally a round-handled sword, which in drawing over time became shortened, until nothing but the cross and globe were left beneath it. Those Hereford Arms were used by "John Carpenter, town clerk of London, who died 1442 A. D." His grandson John Boyd-Carpenter, Baron Boyd-Carpenter (1908–1998), continued the Arms into the new century by passing it down to his son, Thomas Boyd-Carpenter, who was himself knighted after a military career as a Lieutenant-General and for public service.

There is no direct male-to-male Carpenter descent connecting Lord Carpenter and Sir William Boyd Carpenter. The family connection is by marriage through the females in the family.

NOTE: It has been stated that the Hereford Coat of Arms should not be confused with the Arms of Bishop Richard Carpenter (c1450s?-1503) presented in the "Visitations of the County of Oxford taken in 1566, 1574, and 1634, published in 1871, which describe the arms displayed in the buildings at the University in Oxford – "In the Lyberarye of Baliall College." – as recorded by the officials performing the visitations in those years. The Visitations describe the arms of Richard Carpenter (theologian) as: "Paly of nine Gu. and Az. on a chevron Arg. surmounted by a mitre Or, three cross crosslets of—nine pales alternating red and blue, with a silver chevron bearing three gold cross-crosslets.

Peerage of Ireland
Preceded by George Carpenter	Earl of Tyrconnell; 1805–1812	Succeeded by John Delaval Carpenter
