= Frances Carpenter, Countess of Tyrconnel =

Countess of Tyrconnel
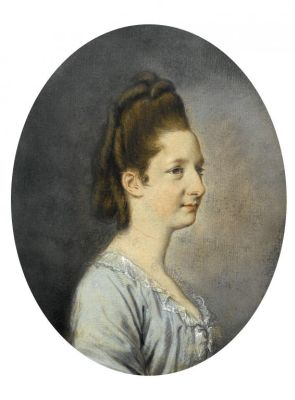
- by Hugh Douglas Hamilton in 1777
- Born: 24 March 1753
- Died: 15 October 1792 (aged 39)
- Spouse(s): George Carpenter, 2nd Earl of Tyrconnell; Phillip Anstruther
- Children: Susanna Carpenter
- Parent(s): John Manners, Marquess of Granby; Lady Frances Seymour

Frances Carpenter, Countess of Tyrconnel (née Manners; 24 March 1753 – 15 October 1792) was an English noblewoman.

== Life ==
Manners was born in 1753. She was the daughter of John Manners, Marquess of Granby and his wife Lady Frances Seymour.

She was herself the wife of George Carpenter, 2nd Earl of Tyrconnel. They married on 9 July 1772 and had one child, Susanna Carpenter (died 1827). Manners eloped with the artist and sporting celebrity Charles Loraine Smith. The elopement was cited in her divorce in 1777. She remarried on 27 October 1777 to Philip Anstruther.
