= Sir John Callander, 1st Baronet =

British politician

Escutcheon of the Callander baronets of Westertown

Colonel Sir John Callander, 1st Baronet MP (September 1739 – 2 April 1812) was a Scottish soldier and politician.

Callander was the son of Alexander Callander, of Westertown, Stirlingshire, and Margaret Ramsay, daughter of David Ramsay. He was a lieutenant-colonel in the 29th Light Dragoons and also sat as Member of Parliament for Berwick-upon-Tweed from 1795 to 1802 and again from 1806 to 1807. In 1798 he was created a baronet, of Westertown in the County of Stirling and of Crichton and Preston Hall and Elphinstone in the Counties of East and Mid Lothian.

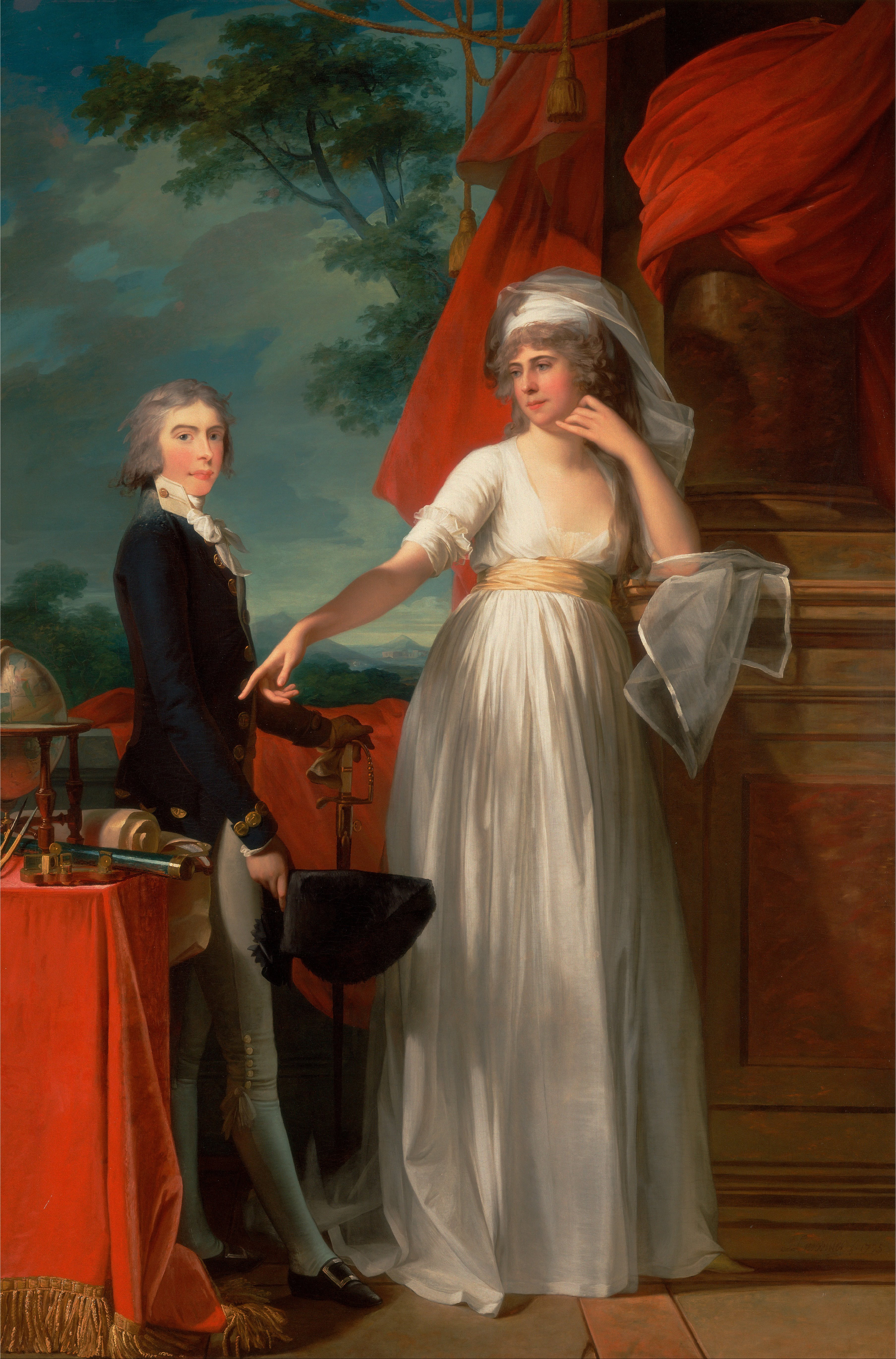
Margaret Callander, 1795 portrait with her son John Kearney from her first marriage

Callander married Margaret Romer, daughter of John Romer, of Cherwick, Northumberland, and widow of Bridges Kearney, in 1786. The marriage was childless. He died in April 1812 when the baronetcy became extinct. Lady Callander died on 22 July 1815.

Parliament of Great Britain
Preceded by Hon. John Vaughan; Hon. Charles Carpenter	Member of Parliament for Berwick-upon-Tweed; 1795–1801; With: Hon. Charles Carpenter 1795–1796; The Earl of Tyrconnel 1796–1801	Succeeded by Parliament of the United Kingdom
Parliament of the United Kingdom
Preceded by Parliament of Great Britain	Member of Parliament for Berwick-upon-Tweed; 1801–1802; With: The Earl of Tyrconnel 1801–1802	Succeeded by Thomas Hall; John Fordyce
Preceded by Francis Sitwell; Alexander Allan	Member of Parliament for Berwick-upon-Tweed; 1806–1807; With: Alexander Tower	Succeeded by Alexander Allan; Sir Alexander Lockhart, Bt
Baronetage of Great Britain
New creation	Baronet (of Westertown, Crichton, Preston Hall and Elphinstone); 1798–1812	Extinct
Preceded by Dallas baronets	Callander baronets of Westertown; 1 August 1798	Succeeded by Calder baronets
