= Constantine Phipps, 1st Baron Mulgrave =

Irish peer

Constantine Phipps, 1st Baron Mulgrave (22 August 1722 (baptised) – 13 September 1775) was an Irish peer. In 1767 he was created Baron Mulgrave, of New Ross in the County of Wexford, in the Peerage of Ireland.

== Family ==
Constantine Phipps, 1st Baron Mulgrave was the son of Lady Catherine Annesley and William Phipps and grandson of Sir Constantine Henry Phipps (1656–1723), who served as Lord Chancellor of Ireland from 1710 to 1714.

Lady Catherine Annesley was the daughter and heiress of James Annesley, 3rd Earl of Anglesey, by his wife, Lady Catherine Darnley (an illegitimate daughter of King James II by his mistress Catherine Sedley, Countess of Dorchester).

Lady Catherine Darnley had later married John Sheffield, 1st Duke of Buckingham and Normanby, making Constantine Phipps, 1st Baron Mulgrave, a step-grandson of the 1st Duke of Buckingham and Normanby.

== Descendants ==
On 26 February 1743 Phipps married Lepell Hervey, the daughter of John Hervey, 2nd Baron Hervey, and Mary Lepell. Constantine Phipps, 1st Baron Mulgrave, and Lepell Hervey had the following offspring:

- Constantine John Phipps, 2nd Baron Mulgrave (30 May 1744 – 10 October 1792)
- Melosinah Maria (5 October 1745, baptised 7 November 1745) died young ?
- Charles Phipps (1753–1786)
- Henry Phipps, 1st Earl of Mulgrave (14 February 1755 – 7 April 1831)
- Henrietta Maria Phipps (26 March 1757 – 1 September 1782), married Charles Dillon, 12th Viscount Dillon
- General Edmund Phipps, MP (7 April 1760 – 14 September 1837)
- Augustus Phipps (1762–1826)

Phipps died on 13 September 1775, aged 53.

Right Honourable Constantine Phipps aged 54 was buried on 5 October 1775 at Croydon, St John, Surrey, England

Peerage of Ireland
New creation	Baron Mulgrave; 1767–1775	Succeeded by Constantine Phipps
