= Constantine Phipps, 1st Marquess of Normanby =

English peer, politician and diplomat (1797–1863)

The Most Honourable The Marquess of Normanby KG GCB GCH PC
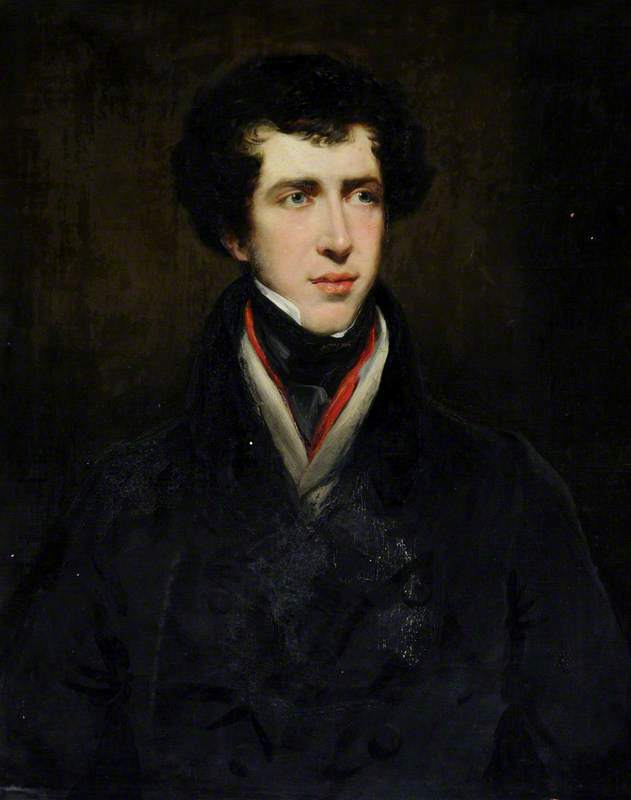
- Portrait by John Jackson

Lord Lieutenant of Ireland
- In office 29 April 1835 – 13 March 1839
- Monarchs: William IV; Victoria
- Prime Minister: The Viscount Melbourne
- Preceded by: The Earl of Haddington
- Succeeded by: Viscount Ebrington

Home Secretary
- In office 30 August 1839 – 30 August 1841
- Monarch: Victoria
- Prime Minister: The Viscount Melbourne
- Preceded by: Lord John Russell
- Succeeded by: Sir James Graham

Personal details
- Born: 15 May 1797
- Died: 28 July 1863 (aged 66)
- Party: Whig
- Spouse: Maria Liddell (m. 1818)
- Children: George
- Education: Trinity College, Cambridge

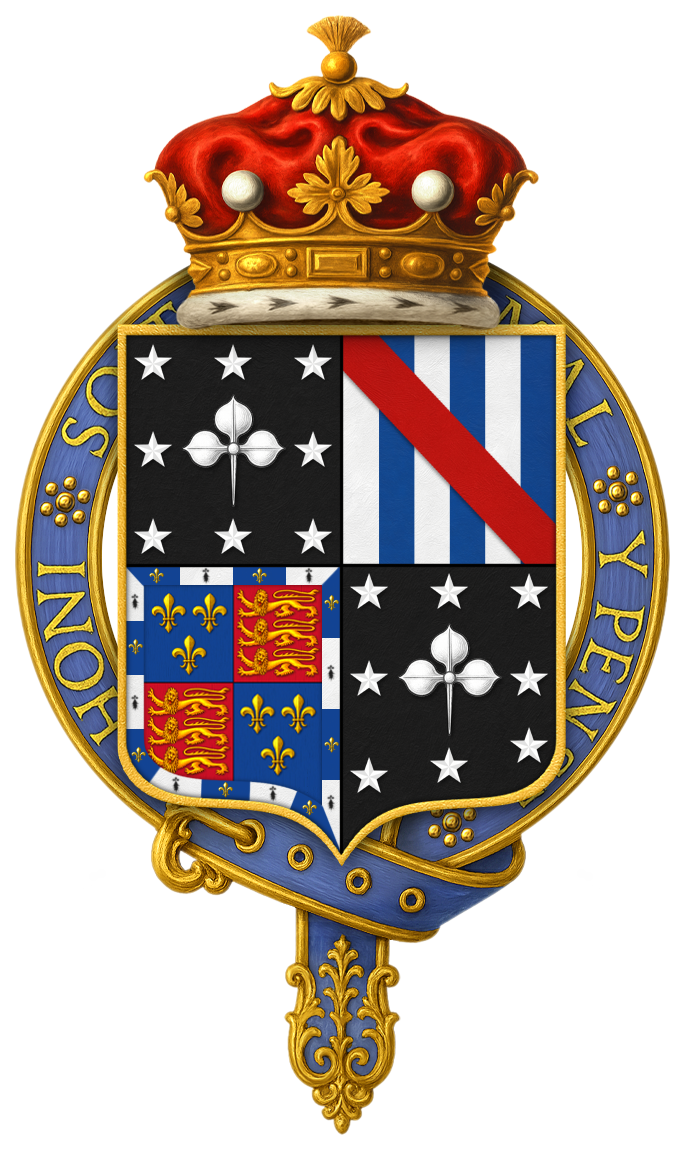
Quartered arms of Constantine Phipps, 1st Marquess of Normanby, KG, GCB, GCH, PC

Constantine Henry Phipps, 1st Marquess of Normanby (15 May 1797 – 28 July 1863), styled Viscount Normanby between 1812 and 1831 and known as The Earl of Mulgrave between 1831 and 1838, was a British Whig politician and author. He notably served as Lord Lieutenant of Ireland from 1835 to 1839 and as Home Secretary from 1839 to 1841 and was British Ambassador to France between 1846 and 1852.

== Early life and education ==
Normanby was the son of Henry Phipps, 1st Earl of Mulgrave and Martha Sophia, daughter of Christopher Thompson Maling. His great-grandfather William Phipps had married Lady Catherine Annesley, who was the daughter and heiress of James Annesley, 3rd Earl of Anglesey and his wife Lady Catherine Darnley (an illegitimate daughter of King James II by his mistress Catherine Sedley, Countess of Dorchester). Lady Catherine Darnley had later married John Sheffield, 1st Duke of Buckingham and Normanby, and hence Constantine Phipps, 2nd Earl of Mulgrave and later 1st Marquess of Normanby was the step-great-great-grandson of the 1st Duke of Buckingham and Normanby. He was educated at Harrow and Trinity College, Cambridge, where he was the second President of the Cambridge Union Society.

Lt.-Gen. Sir Henry Warre was his first cousin, born to his mother's youngest sister, who married Sir William Warre.

== Political career ==
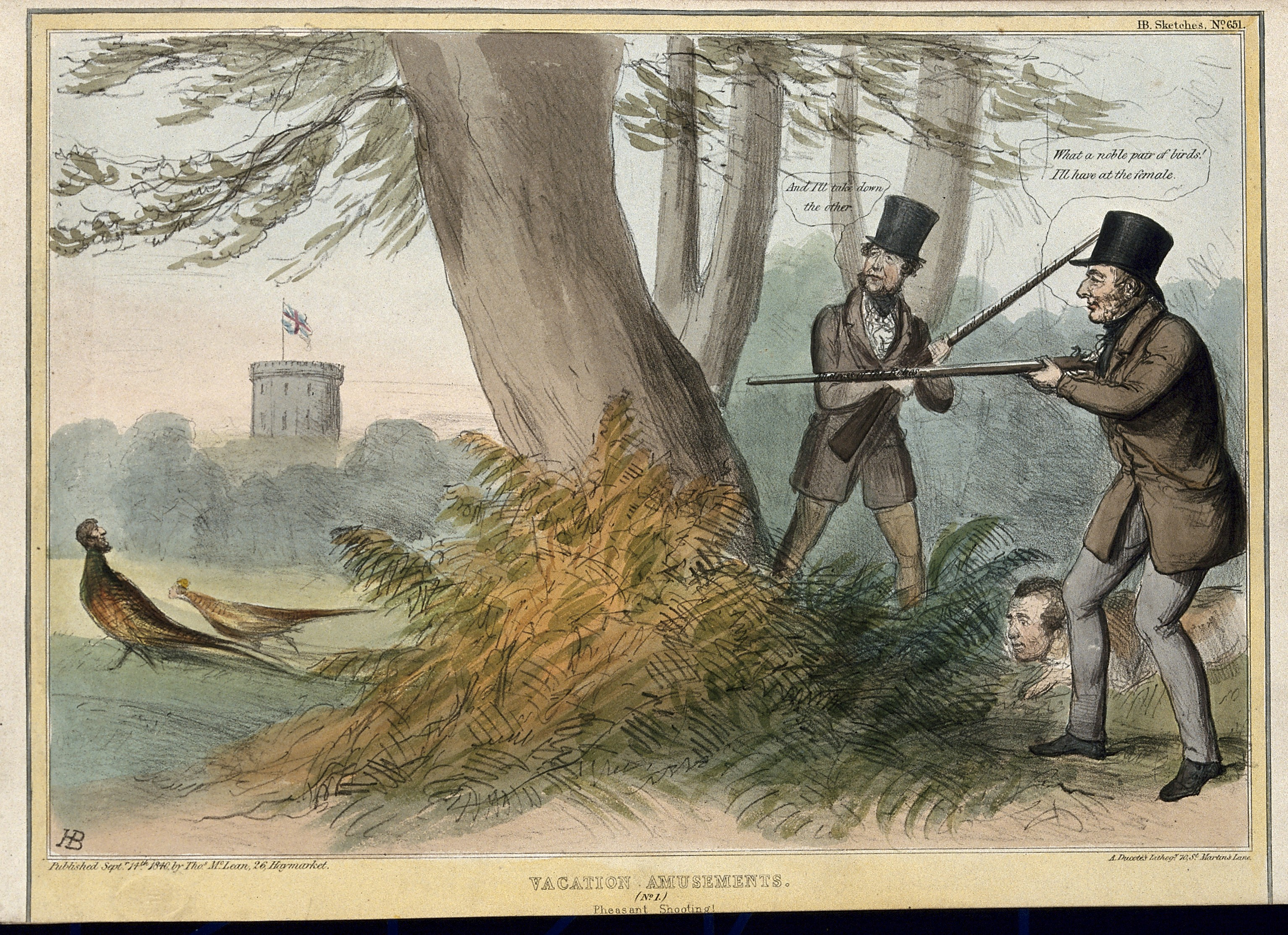
Lord Melbourne and the Marquess of Normanby prepare to shoot two pheasants with the heads of the Duke and Duchess of Beaufort, with Windsor Castle in the background. Coloured lithograph by John Doyle, c. 1840

After attaining his majority, he was returned on his father's interest for Scarborough in 1818. However, in the summer of 1819, he began to break with his family's Tory politics, and signalised his conversion to the Whigs by joining Brooks' Club on 3 December. When Parliament was dissolved in 1820, Normanby was in Florence, Italy, to which he was a regular visitor. His brother Charles kept up the family interest with the Scarborough corporation, and Normanby was returned in absentia in March, despite being politically at odds with his father. This state of affairs was not to last long: in May, Normanby was compelled to take the Chiltern Hundreds by Lord Mulgrave, to vacate the seat for Mulgrave's brother Edmund.

His standing as a former Tory minister's son made Normanby valuable to the Whigs, and they hoped to return him to Parliament in another seat. An attempt was made to have him put in at St Ives at a by-election in 1821, but support proved to be lacking, and Normanby withdrew without contesting the seat. The illness and death of William Plumer in the beginning of 1822 allowed him to take his seat in February for Higham Ferrers, a pocket borough of the Whig grandee Earl Fitzwilliam. He made a considerable reputation by political pamphlets and by his speeches in the house. He was returned for Malton at the general election of 1826, another one of Fitzwilliam's boroughs. He was already known as a writer of romantic tales, The English in Italy (1825); in the same year he made his appearance as a novelist with Matilda, and in 1828 he produced another novel, Yes and No. He declined to be nominated again for Malton in 1830, anticipating the imminent death of his father, and was thus out of Parliament when Lord Grey formed a government in November 1830. Normanby hoped for employment by the foreign office, but none was forthcoming. Through Lord Durham, Normanby solicited a writ in acceleration from Grey in early 1831, which would have brought him up to the House of Lords before his father's death; but Normanby succeeded to the Earldom of Mulgrave on his father's death in April, rendering it moot.

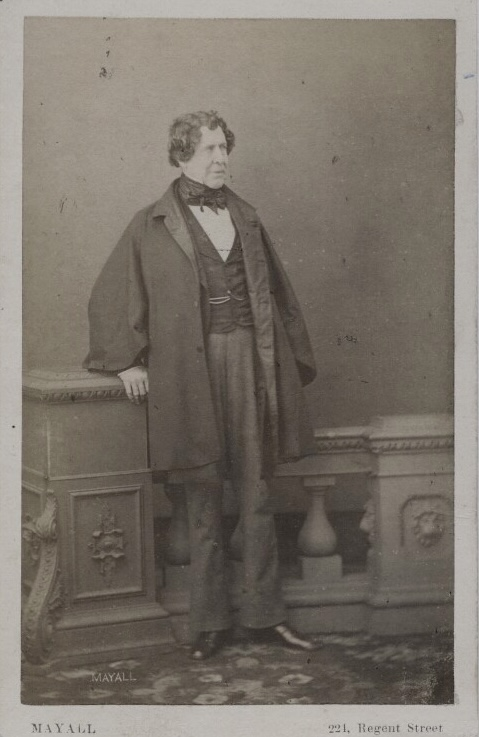
Photograph by John Jabez Edwin Mayall, c. 1860-63

In 1832, Mulgrave was sent out as Governor of Jamaica and was afterwards appointed Lord Lieutenant of Ireland (1835–1839). On his visit to Wexford in 1836 he heard a Congratulatory Address in the ancient Forth and Bargy dialect, then already on the point of becoming extinct. He was created Marquess of Normanby on 25 June 1838, and held successively the offices of colonial secretary and home secretary in the last years of Lord Melbourne's ministry. While Colonial Secretary, he wrote a letter of instructions to William Hobson, in which the government's policy for the sovereignty of New Zealand was set out.

== Diplomatic career ==
From 1846 to 1852 he was ambassador at Paris, and from 1854 to 1858 minister at Florence. The publication in 1857 of a journal kept in Paris during the stormy times of 1848 (A Year of Revolution), brought him into violent controversy with Louis Blanc, and he came into conflict with Lord Palmerston and William Ewart Gladstone, after his retirement from the public service, on questions of French and Italian policy.

== Marriage and children ==
Lord Normanby married Maria Liddell (1798–1882), daughter of Thomas Liddell, 1st Baron Ravensworth, in 1818. They had one son:

- George Augustus Constantine Phipps, 2nd Marquess of Normanby (23 Jul 1819 - 3 April 1890)

== Death ==
Normanby died in London on 28 July 1863, aged 66, and was succeeded in his titles by his son George. The Marchioness of Normanby died in October 1882, aged 84.

== Writings ==
- The English in Italy, a novel in three volumes (1825):
  - [n.a.] (1825). The English in Italy. Vol. i. London: Saunders and Otley.
  - [n.a.] (1825). The English in Italy. Vol. ii. London: Saunders and Otley.
  - [n.a.] (1825). The English in Italy. Vol. iii. London: Saunders and Otley.
- [n.a.] (1825). Matilda: a Tale of the Day. London: Henry Colburn. (four editions).
- Historiettes, in three volumes (1827):
  - 'The Author of "The English in Italy"' (1827). Historiettes, or Tales of Continental Life. Vol. i. London: Saunders and Otley.
  - 'The Author of "The English in Italy"' (1827). Historiettes, or Tales of Continental Life. Vol. ii. London: Saunders and Otley.
  - 'The Author of "The English in Italy"' (1827). Historiettes, or Tales of Continental Life. Vol. ii. London: Saunders and Otley.
- The English in France, in three volumes (1828):
  - 'The Author of "The English in Italy"' (1828). The English in France. Vol. i. London: Saunders and Otley. hdl:2027/uiug.30112059255981.
  - 'The Author of "The English in Italy"' (1828). The English in France. Vol. ii. London: Saunders and Otley.
  - 'The Author of "The English in Italy"' (1828). The English in France. Vol. iii. London: Saunders and Otley.
- Yes and No: a Tale of the Day, in two volumes (1828):
  - 'The Author of "Matilda"' (1828). Yes and No: a Tale of the Day. Vol. i. London: Henry Colburn.
  - 'The Author of "Matilda"' (1828). Yes and No: a Tale of the Day. Vol. ii. London: Henry Colburn.
- The Contrast, in three volumes (1832):
  - 'The Author of "Matilda," "Yes and No," &c. &c.' (1832). The Contrast. Vol. i. London: Henry Colburn and Richard Bentley.
  - 'The Author of "Matilda," "Yes and No," &c. &c.' (1832). The Contrast. Vol. ii. London: Henry Colburn and Richard Bentley.
  - 'The Author of "Matilda," "Yes and No," &c. &c.' (1832). The Contrast. Vol. iii. London: Henry Colburn and Richard Bentley.

== Notes ==
Parliament of the United Kingdom
Preceded by Edmund Phipps; Charles Manners-Sutton	Member of Parliament for Scarborough; 1818–1820; With: Charles Manners-Sutton	Succeeded by Edmund Phipps; Charles Manners-Sutton
Preceded by William Plumer	Member of Parliament for Higham Ferrers; 1822–1826	Succeeded by Frederick Ponsonby
Preceded by Viscount Duncannon; John Charles Ramsden	Member of Parliament for Malton; 1826–1830; With: John Charles Ramsden	Succeeded by John Charles Ramsden; James Scarlett
Government offices
Preceded by George Cuthbert, acting	Governor of Jamaica; 1832–1834	Succeeded by Amos Norcott, acting
Political offices
Preceded by The Earl of Carlisle	Lord Privy Seal; 1834	Succeeded by The Lord Wharncliffe
Preceded by The Earl of Haddington	Lord Lieutenant of Ireland; 1835–1839	Succeeded by Viscount Ebrington
Preceded by The Lord Glenelg	Secretary of State for War and the Colonies; 1839	Succeeded by Lord John Russell
Preceded by Lord John Russell	Home Secretary; 1839–1841	Succeeded by Sir James Graham
Diplomatic posts
Preceded by The 1st Lord Cowley	British Ambassador to France; 1846–1852	Succeeded by The 2nd Lord Cowley
Preceded by Sir Henry Bulwer	British Minister to Tuscany; 1854–1858	Succeeded by Henry Howard (pro tempore)
Peerage of the United Kingdom
New creation	Marquess of Normanby; 1838–1863	Succeeded by George Phipps
Preceded by Henry Phipps	Earl of Mulgrave; 1831–1863	Succeeded by George Phipps
