= Lord Charles Somerset =

British politician (1767–1831)

General The Right Honourable Lord Charles Somerset
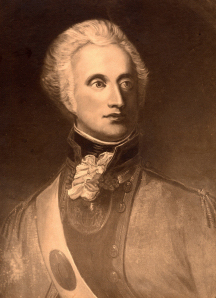

Governor of the Cape Colony
- In office 1814–1826
- Monarchs: George III; George IV
- Preceded by: John Cradock
- Succeeded by: Richard Bourke (acting)

Personal details
- Born: 12 December 1767
- Died: 18 February 1831 (aged 63)
- Spouses: Lady Elizabeth Courtenay (m. 1788; died 1815); Lady Mary Poulett (m. 1821)
- Children: 9, including Henry and Poulett
- Parents: Henry Somerset, 5th Duke of Beaufort; Elizabeth Boscawen

Lord Charles Henry Somerset PC (12 December 1767 – 18 February 1831), born in Badminton, England, was a British soldier, politician and colonial administrator. He was governor of the Cape Colony, South Africa, from 1814 to 1826.

== Early life ==
Somerset was the second son of Henry Somerset, 5th Duke of Beaufort, and Elizabeth, daughter of Admiral the Hon. Edward Boscawen. He was the brother of Henry Somerset, 6th Duke of Beaufort, General Lord Robert Somerset, Lord Arthur Somerset and Field Marshal FitzRoy Somerset, 1st Baron Raglan.

== Career ==
Somerset sat as member of parliament for Scarborough between 1796 and 1802 and for Monmouth Boroughs between 1802 and 1813. He served as Comptroller of the Household between 1797 and 1804 and as Joint Paymaster of the Forces between 1804 and 1806 and 1807 and 1813 and was sworn of the Privy Council on 26 April 1797. In 1814 he was appointed Governor of the Cape Colony, a post he held until 1826. The towns of Somerset West and Somerset East in South Africa are named after him.

== Personal life ==
Somerset married firstly Lady Elizabeth Courtenay (1766–1815), on 7 June 1788, following their elopement. She was the daughter of the 8th Earl of Devon. They had six children:

1. Elizabeth Somerset (1790–1872), who married Gen. Hon. Sir Henry Wyndham in 1812.
2. Mary Georgiana Somerset (1793–1856), who married Lt-Col. Stirling Freeman Glover in 1833.
3. Sir Henry Somerset (1794–1862), a Lieutenant-General.
4. Charlotte Augusta Somerset (1799–1864), who married Herbert Cornewall in 1822.
5. Charles Henry Somerset (1800–1835), a Lieutenant-Colonel.
6. Villiers Somerset (1803–1855), a Reverend who married Frances Dorothy Ley in 1844 and had issue.

After the death of Lady Elizabeth, he married secondly Lady Mary Poulett, daughter of John Poulett, 4th Earl Poulett, on 9 August 1821. They had three children:

1. Poulett George Henry Somerset (1822–1875), a Colonel who married Barbara Augusta Norah Mytton, daughter of John Mytton, in 1847. After her death in 1870, he married Emily Moore.
2. Mary Sophia Somerset (1823–1869)
3. Augusta Anne Somerset (1824–1881), who married Sir Henry Barron, 1st Baronet in 1863.

Somerset died in February 1831, aged 63. His second wife died in June 1860, aged 72.

== Ancestry ==
Ancestors of Lord Charles Somerset

Charles Somerset, Marquess of Worcester
Henry Somerset, 2nd Duke of Beaufort
Rebecca Child
Charles Somerset, 4th Duke of Beaufort
Wriothesley Noel, 2nd Earl of Gainsborough
Rachel Noel
Catherine Greville
Henry Somerset, 5th Duke of Beaufort
Richard Berkeley
John Symes Berkeley
Elizabeth Symes
Elizabeth Berkeley
Walter Norborne
Elizabeth Norborne
Frances Bacon
Lord Charles Somerset
Edward Boscawen (MP)
Hugh Boscawen, 1st Viscount Falmouth
Jael Godolphin
Admiral Rt. Hon. Edward Boscawen
Col. Charles Godfrey
Charlotte Godfrey
Arabella Churchill
Elizabeth Boscawen
George Evelyn, MP for Bletchingley
William Evelyn Glanville, High Sheriff of Kent
Frances Broomhall
Frances Evelyn Glanville
William Glanville, Barrister of Middle Temple
Frances Glanville
Frances Hales

Parliament of Great Britain
Preceded by The Earl of Tyrconnell; Edmund Phipps	Member of Parliament for Scarborough; 1796–1801; With: Edmund Phipps	Succeeded by Parliament of the United Kingdom
Parliament of the United Kingdom
Preceded by Parliament of Great Britain	Member of Parliament for Scarborough; 1801–1802; With: Edmund Phipps	Succeeded by Edmund Phipps; Lord Robert Manners
Preceded by Lord Robert Somerset	Member of Parliament for Monmouth Boroughs; 1802–1813	Succeeded by Marquess of Worcester
Political offices
Preceded by The Earl of Macclesfield	Comptroller of the Household; 1797–1804	Succeeded by Lord George Thynne
Preceded by Thomas Steele; John Hiley Addington	Paymaster of the Forces; 1804–1806; With: George Rose	Succeeded by Earl Temple; Lord John Townshend
Preceded by Earl Temple; Lord John Townshend	Paymaster of the Forces; 1807–1813; With: Charles Long	Succeeded by Charles Long; Hon. F. J. Robinson
Government offices
Preceded by John Cradock	Governor of the Cape Colony; 1814–1826	Succeeded by Richard Bourke (acting)
