= Herbert Webbe =

English cricketer

Herbert Ross Webbe (18 May 1856 – 9 May 1886) was an English barrister and first-class cricketer active 1875–81 who played for Middlesex, Marylebone Cricket Club (MCC) and Oxford University. The son of Alexander Allan Webbe (1808–1868), a man of independent means, and Marian Cutler (1825–1914), he was born in Westminster and educated at Winchester College and New College, Oxford, after which he was called to the bar at Lincoln's Inn. He died unexpectedly of heart failure in Paddington, after which a boy's club, the Webbe Institute, was founded in his memory at Oxford House, Bethnal Green, in recognition of his work with underprivileged boys in the East End. His brothers George and Alexander Josiah were also well-known first-class cricketers.
