= Yes and No (novel) =

1828 novel

- Author: Lord Normanby
- Language: English
- Genre: Silver Fork
- Publisher: Henry Colburn
- Publication date: 1828
- Publication place: United Kingdom
- Media type: Print

Yes and No is an 1828 novel by the British writer and politician Lord Normanby, originally published in two volumes. It was part of the popular genre of silver fork novels which focused on the British upper classes in the later Regency era. It was his second published work following Matilda in 1825. The novel focuses heavily on the politics of Britain in the late 1820s, focusing on three main protagonists and examining the Whigs, liberal Tories, and Ultra-Tories.

== Synopsis ==
During an election to Parliament, the stridently radical Whig Oakley stands against the liberal Canningite Tory Germain. Thanks to dealmaking organised by the rakish dandy Fitzalbert, Germain is elected thanks to a deal with the Ultra-Tory Steadman and his reactionary supporters. Oakley then inherits his uncle's estate and titles and enters Parliament as a lord, but is killed in a duel with Fitzalbert. Ultimately Germain makes a happy marriage with a politically shrewd wife and enjoys a successful career in Parliament, succeeding where Oakley through his hot-heated manner has ultimately failed.

== Bibliography ==
- Adburgham, Alison. Silver Fork Society: Fashionable Life and Literature from 1814 to 1840. Faber & Faber, 2012.
- Copeland, Edward. The Silver Fork Novel: Fashionable Fiction in the Age of Reform. Cambridge University Press, 2012.
