= USS Vengeance (1779) =

Merchant ship that served in the Revolutionary War

USS Vengeance (1779) was a former merchant ship that served under the command of John Paul Jones in the Revolutionary War. The French Royal Navy purchased her at Bordeaux in 1779 for Jones and sold her when she arrived at Dunkirk in January 1780 after the battle between Bonhomme Richard and the rest of Jones's squadron on the one side, and HMS Serapis and HM hired armed ship Countess of Scarborough on the other.
