= George Osbaldeston the elder =

George Osbaldeston (c.1753–1793) was an English landowner and politician. To 1770 he was known as George Wickins. He was father of George, known as Squire Osbaldeston, the noted sportsman.

== Life ==
He was the son of John Wickins, vicar of Petworth, Sussex, and his wife Philadelphia Mitford. He inherited in 1770 estates from Fountayne Wentworth Osbaldeston, who was his maternal great-uncle, and changed his surname accordingly. Shortly before that he had been admitted, age 16, to St John's College, Cambridge; he matriculated there in 1773, graduating Master of Arts (MA) per literas regias. He resided at Hutton Buscel. In 1783 he succeeded his father in further Osbaldeston property.

Osbaldeston went into politics with the backing of the Fox–North Coalition in November 1783, ahead of the 1784 British general election. He stood for the local set of Scarborough, rather than the rotten borough offered him, Hedon, and was elected. As an independent, he supported the Pitt administration. In 1790 he did not defend his seat. He died on 14 July 1793.

== Family ==
Osbaldeston married Jane Head, daughter of Sir Thomas Head of Langley Hall, Berkshire. George Osbaldeston the sportsman was their son.

== Notes ==
Parliament of Great Britain
Preceded by Charles Phipps; The Earl of Tyrconnell	Member of Parliament for Scarborough; 1784 – 1790; With: The Earl of Tyrconnell	Succeeded by Hon. Henry Phipps; The Earl of Tyrconnell
