= Matilda (Normanby novel) =

1825 novel by Lord Normanby

- Author: Lord Normanby
- Language: English
- Genre: Silver Fork
- Publisher: Henry Colburn
- Publication date: 1825
- Publication place: United Kingdom
- Media type: Print

Matilda is an 1825 novel by the British writer and politician Lord Normanby, originally published in two volumes. It was part of the emerging, popular genre of silver fork novels that focused on the fashionable British upper classes in the later Regency era, and was his first published work. He followed it with a second silver fork novel, the political Yes and No in 1828.

Lady Holland said "it is for the first fifty pages full of wit and observation on manners and society, and then becomes commonplace and like any trashy, sentimental novel".

== Synopsis ==
Matilda Deleval and Augustus Arlingford fall in love. However, her guardian prevents them from meeting as Arlingford is a second son and therefore does not stand to inherit his family's wealth. While Augustus is in Europe, the newspaper John Bull scurrilously reports he has begun living with an Italian woman. Feeling betrayed, Matilda is persuaded by her guardian to marry a wealthy self-made merchant from Manchester who has recently acquired a baronetcy. After the unexpected death of his wastrel brother Arlingford has inherited his brother's title and money, and returns to England only to find Matilda now married. Later Matilda's husband encourages her to try and persuade Augustus to allow a planned railway to be built across his estate. Witnessing her abusive treatment by her husband, Augustus takes her away from him but their romance still ends tragically. Augustus then goes to fight for the Greeks in their War of Independence.

== Bibliography ==
- Adburgham, Alison. Silver Fork Society: Fashionable Life and Literature from 1814 to 1840. Faber & Faber, 2012.
- Copeland, Edward. The Silver Fork Novel: Fashionable Fiction in the Age of Reform. Cambridge University Press, 2012.
