= Henry Phipps, 1st Earl of Mulgrave =

British Army officer and politician

General The Right Honourable The Earl of Mulgrave GCB PC
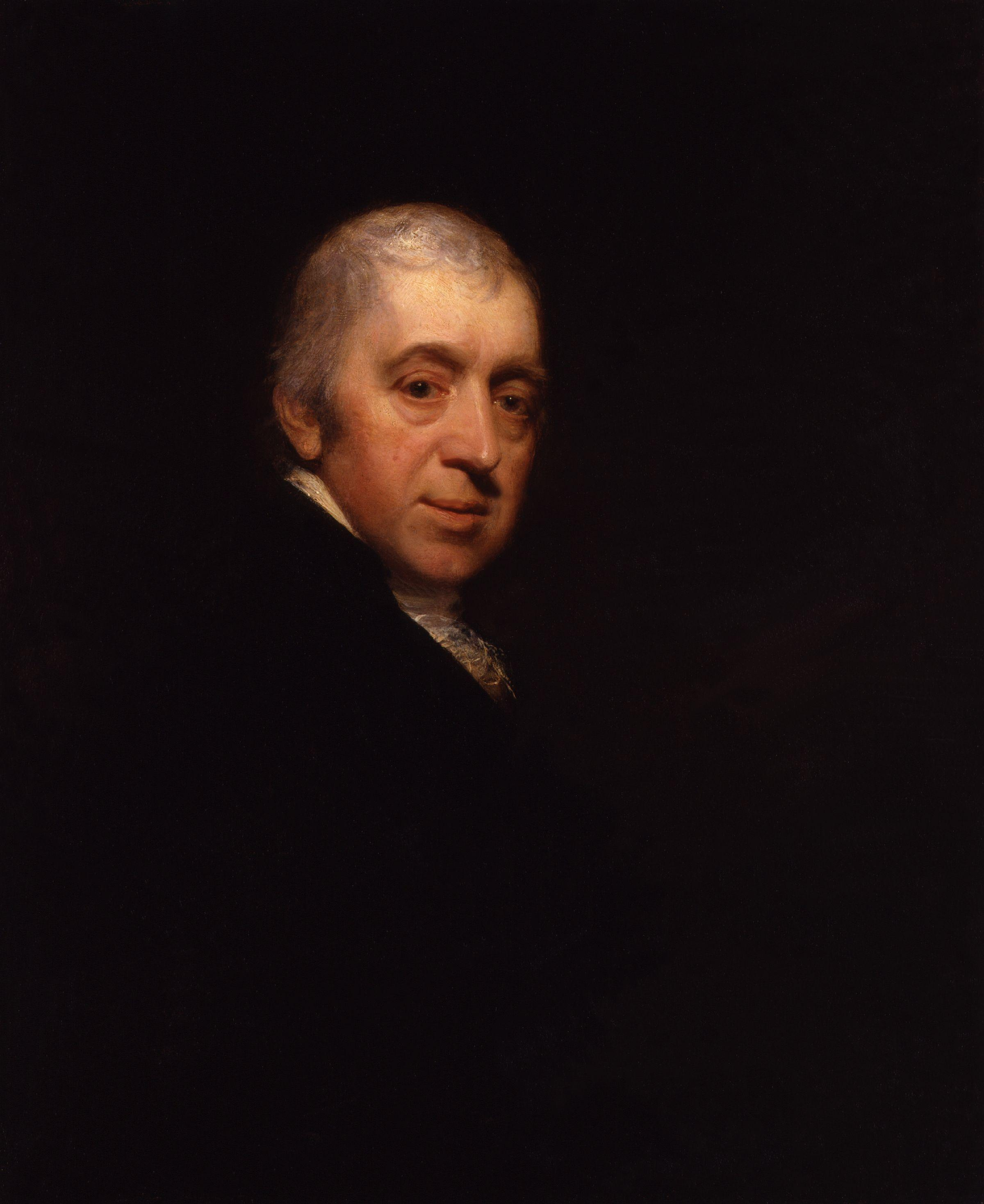
- Portrait by William Beechey, 1807

Foreign Secretary
- In office 11 January 1805 – 7 February 1806
- Monarch: George III
- Prime Minister: William Pitt the Younger
- Preceded by: The Lord Harrowby
- Succeeded by: Charles James Fox

Chancellor of the Duchy of Lancaster
- In office 6 June 1804 – 14 January 1805
- Monarch: George III
- Prime Minister: William Pitt the Younger
- Preceded by: The Lord Pelham
- Succeeded by: Lord Hobart

Personal details
- Born: 14 February 1755
- Died: 7 April 1831 (aged 76)
- Party: Tory
- Spouse: Martha Sophia Maling (m. 1795)
- Children: Constantine Phipps, 1st Marquess of Normanby; Sir Charles Beaumont Phipps; Edmund Phipps; Augustus Phipps; Five daughters
- Parents: Constantine Phipps, 1st Baron Mulgrave; Lepell Hervey
- Relatives: James II of England (great-great-grandfather)
- Education: Eton College; Middle Temple

General Henry Phipps, 1st Earl of Mulgrave, GCB, PC (14 February 1755 – 7 April 1831), styled The Honourable Henry Phipps until 1792 and known as The Lord Mulgrave from 1792 to 1812, was a British Army officer and politician who served as Foreign Secretary from 1805 to 1806.

== Early life ==
Phipps was a younger son of Constantine Phipps, 1st Baron Mulgrave of New Ross), by his wife the Hon. Lepell, daughter of John Hervey, 2nd Baron Hervey. His paternal grandparents were William Phipps and Lady Catherine Annesley (who was the daughter and heiress of James Annesley, 3rd Earl of Anglesey, and his wife, Lady Catherine Darnley, herself an illegitimate daughter of King James II by his mistress Catherine Sedley, Countess of Dorchester). As Lady Catherine Darnley later married John Sheffield, 1st Duke of Buckingham and Normanby, Phipps was the step-great-grandson of the 1st Duke of Buckingham and Normanby.

He was educated at Eton and the Middle Temple.

== Career ==
Lord Mulgrave entered the army in 1775, and eventually rose to the rank of General. He saw service in the Caribbean during the American Revolutionary War. In 1793 he was made Colonel of the 31st (Huntingdonshire) Regiment of Foot. Also in 1793, because he was on a mission to the King of Sardinia in Turin, he was near at hand when British forces captured the French port of Toulon, and he briefly took command of the British land forces there, before withdrawing upon the arrival of more senior officers. In 1799 he was sent out on another special military mission, this time to the headquarters of the Austrian commander, Archduke Charles, to attempt to persuade him to retain his troops in Switzerland rather than removing them to the Middle Rhine, but he was unsuccessful.

=== Political career ===
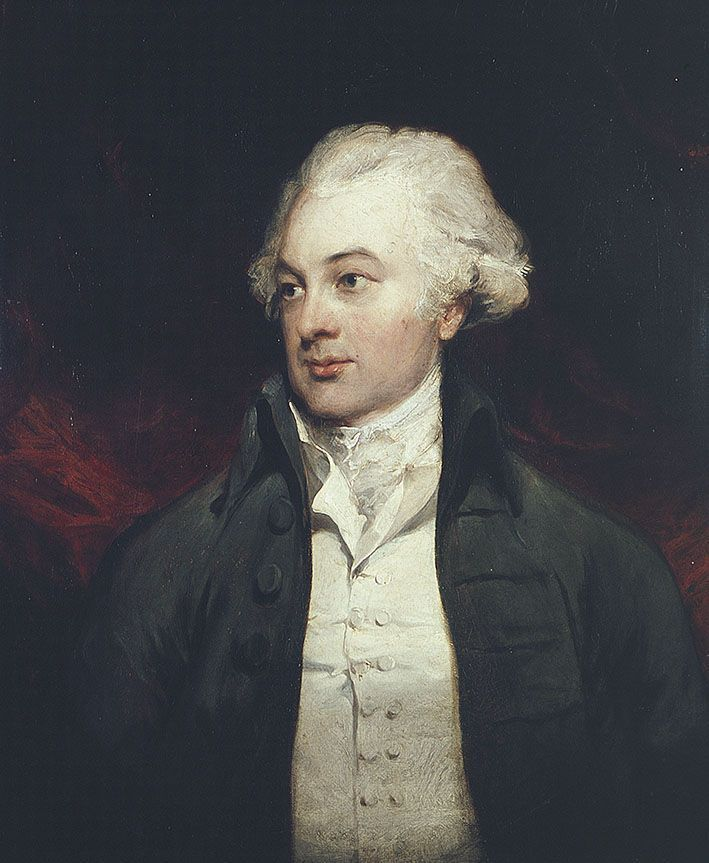
Portrait of Lord Mulgrave, by Sir Thomas Lawrence, c. 1790

In 1784 Lord Mulgrave was elected to the House of Commons for Totnes. He supported the government of Pitt, to whom he eventually became close. In 1790, he was elected for Scarborough in Yorkshire. He succeeded his brother Constantine Phipps, 2nd Baron Mulgrave as Baron Mulgrave in the Peerage of Ireland in 1792, but did not succeed to his brother's British title. In 1794 he was granted a British peerage as Baron Mulgrave, entering the House of Lords, and in 1796 he was made Governor of Scarborough Castle. Mulgrave supported Pitt when he resigned in 1801, and in return for his loyalty was rewarded with the office of Chancellor of the Duchy of Lancaster (1804–1805) in Pitt's second government. Following an accident suffered by Lord Harrowby, Mulgrave took his place as Foreign Secretary, in which position he helped Pitt to form the Third Coalition against Napoleon.

The post of Foreign Secretary was generally thought to be beyond his powers. Thomas Grenville, writing to the Marquis of Buckingham, expressed an opinion that he was only "put in ad interim until Lord Wellesley's arrival, who is expected in June". Mulgrave, however, showed himself fairly capable in debate. On 11 February 1805 he had to announce the breach with Spain, and to defend the seizure of the treasure ships at Ferrol before the declaration of war, and on 20 June to defend the coalition of 1805. He composed an ode on the victory of Trafalgar, and it was set to music by Thomas Arne. On 23 January 1806 Pitt died. On 28 January 1806 Mulgrave laid before the House of Lords copies of the treaties recently concluded with Russia and Sweden, to which Prussia and Austria had acceded, and on 4 February he explained their object. Three days later, on 7 February, he resigned, with the bulk of those who had been Pitt's friends.

With the death of Pitt and the formation of the Ministry of All the Talents in 1806, Mulgrave, along with the other Pittites, went into opposition, but when the Pittites returned to power in 1807, Mulgrave served in various major offices, first as First Lord of the Admiralty (1807–1810), then as Master-General of the Ordnance (1810–1819), and finally as Minister without Portfolio (1819–1820). As First Lord he was heavily involved in planning both the successful expedition against Copenhagen in 1807, and the disastrous one to Walcheren in 1809. After moving to the ordnance board, Mulgrave became less active politically. In 1812, he was created Viscount Normanby and Earl of Mulgrave in the Peerage of the United Kingdom. As Master-General of the Ordnance, Mulgrave approved the transfer of John Nash's Rotunda from Carlton House to Woolwich Common in 1818. The building, which had served as a temporary ballroom for celebrations of the allied victory over Napoleon in 1814, was granted to Sir William Congreve, 2nd Baronet, who had succeeded his father as Commandant of the Royal Military Repository. On 7 December 1818, Congreve formally requested the building be erected "on the brow of the Hill at the eastern boundary of the Repository Grounds," and Mulgrave's approval enabled its reconstruction in 1819–1820 as a permanent museum for the Royal Artillery, where it remains today.

== Personal life ==
In 1795 at St Michael's, Houghton-le-Spring, Lord Mulgrave was married to Martha Sophia Maling (1771–1849), daughter of pottery manufacturer Christopher Thomson Maling. Together, they were the parents of five daughters (only one of whom survived childhood) and four sons, including:

- Constantine Henry Phipps, 1st Marquess of Normanby (1797–1863), who married Maria Liddell, daughter of Thomas Liddell, 1st Baron Ravensworth, in 1818.
- Hon. Sir Charles Beaumont Phipps (1801–1866), who married Margaret Anne Bathurst in 1835.
- Hon. Edmund Phipps (1808–1857), a lawyer and author who married Maria Louisa (née Campbell) Norton, widow of the Hon. Charles Francis Norton, daughter of Lt.-Gen. Sir Colin Campbell, in 1838.
- Hon. Augustus Frederick (1809-1896), a Reverend who became honorary canon of Ely; he married Lady Mary Elizabeth Emily FitzRoy, a daughter of Henry FitzRoy, 5th Duke of Grafton.

Lord Mulgrave died in April 1831, aged 76, and was succeeded by his eldest son, Constantine, who was later created Marquess of Normanby. The Countess of Mulgrave died on 17 October 1849.

== See also ==
- Ramsay Weston Phipps

Parliament of Great Britain
Preceded by Sir Philip Jennings-Clerke, Bt; Launcelot Brown	Member of Parliament for Totnes; 1784–1790; With: Sir Philip Jennings-Clerke, Bt 1784–1788; Viscount Barnard 1788–1790	Succeeded by William Powlett Powlett; Francis Buller-Yarde
Preceded by The Earl of Tyrconnell; George Osbaldeston	Member of Parliament for Scarborough; 1790–1794; With: The Earl of Tyrconnell	Succeeded by The Earl of Tyrconnell; Edmund Phipps
Political offices
Preceded by Lord Pelham	Chancellor of the Duchy of Lancaster; 1804–1805	Succeeded by The Earl of Buckinghamshire
Preceded by The Lord Harrowby	Foreign Secretary; 1805–1806	Succeeded by Charles James Fox
Preceded by Thomas Grenville	First Lord of the Admiralty; 1807–1810	Succeeded by Charles Philip Yorke
Preceded by The Earl of Chatham	Master-General of the Ordnance; 1810–1819	Succeeded by The Duke of Wellington
Honorary titles
Preceded by The Earl of Carlisle	Lord Lieutenant of the East Riding of Yorkshire; 1807–1824	Succeeded by Viscount Morpeth
Vacant Title last held by The Duke of Leeds	Vice-Admiral of Yorkshire; 1809–1831	Vacant Title next held by The Lord Londesborough
Peerage of the United Kingdom
New creation	Earl of Mulgrave; 1812–1831	Succeeded by Constantine Henry Phipps
Peerage of Great Britain
New creation	Baron Mulgrave; 1794–1831	Succeeded by Constantine Henry Phipps
Peerage of Ireland
Preceded by Constantine John Phipps	Baron Mulgrave; 1792–1831	Succeeded by Constantine Henry Phipps
