= John Fordyce (politician) =

British banker and politician

John Cornelius Fordyce (1735–1809) was Member of Parliament for New Romney from 1796 to 1802, and for Berwick-Upon-Tweed from 1802 to 5 April 1803.

He was the son of Thomas Fordyce of Ayton, an Edinburgh lawyer and Elizabeth Whitefoord, daughter of Adam Whitefoord, 1st Baronet. Fordyce became a banker and by the age of 24 was a Director of the Royal Bank. His own bank, Fordyce, Malcolm and Co., collapsed in 1772.

He entered Parliament in 1796, sitting for New Romney until 1802 and then Berwick-Upon-Tweed until 1803. He was appointed Surveyor General of the Land Revenues of the Crown in 1794.

He married Catharine, the daughter of Sir William Maxwell, 3rd Baronet of Monreith, Wigtown, and elder sister of Jane Gordon, Duchess of Gordon. The Fordyces had at least two sons and four daughters. One of their daughters, Magdalen, married William Blair, who went on to become the MP for Ayrshire. Another daughter, Jean, died suddenly and unwed in 1798.

Parliament of Great Britain
Preceded by Elijah Impey; Richard Joseph Sullivan	Member of Parliament for New Romney; 1796-1802; With: John Willett Willett	Succeeded by Manasseh Masseh Lopes; John Willett Willett
Preceded by George Carpenter; John Callander	Member of Parliament for Berwick-Upon-Tweed; 1802-03; With: Thomas Hall	Succeeded by Francis Sitwell; Alexander Allan
