= Constantine Phipps, 2nd Baron Mulgrave =

Royal Navy officer, explorer and politician

Captain The Right Honourable The Lord Mulgrave PC FRS
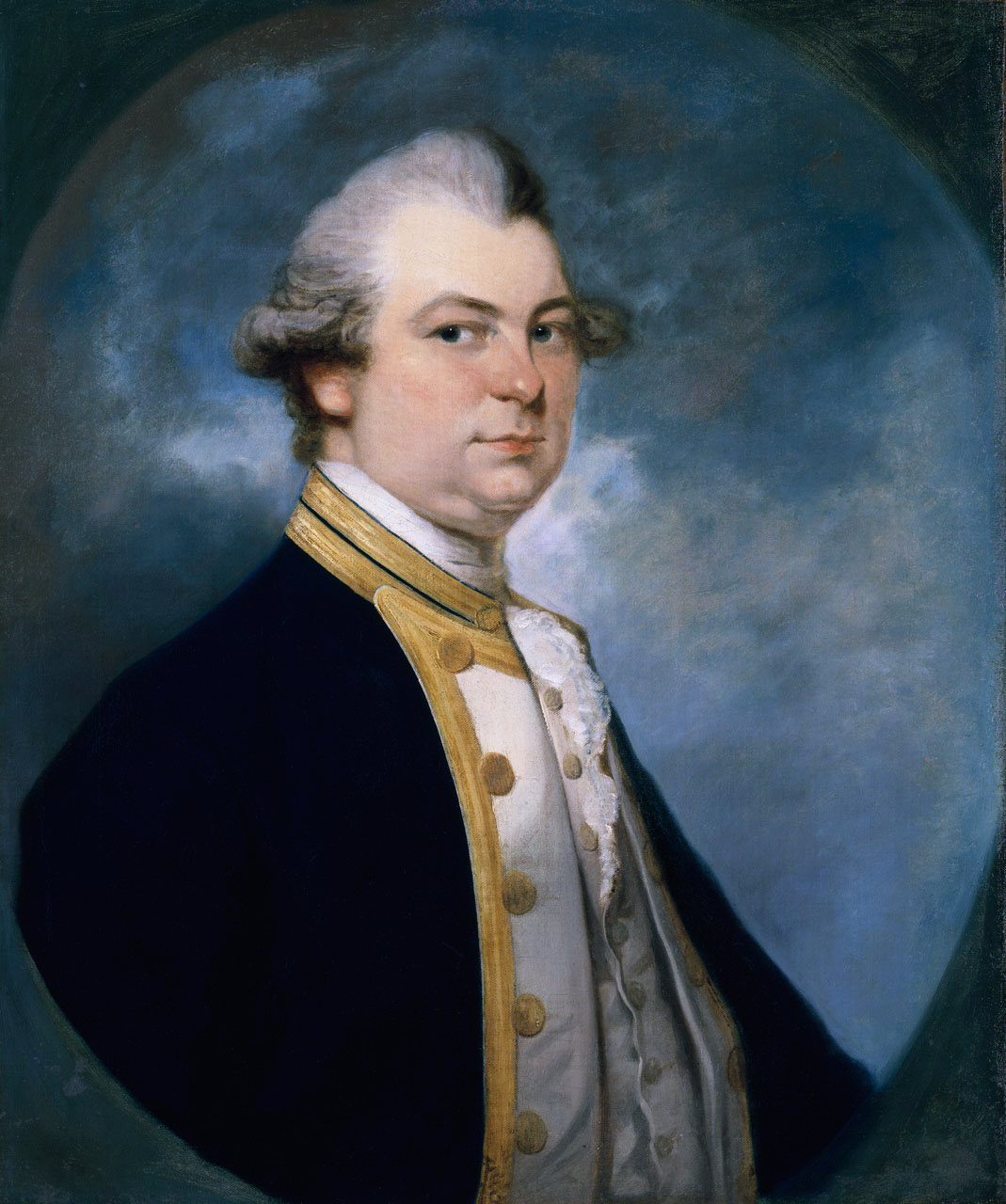
- 1779 portrait of Phipps by Ozias Humphry
- Born: Constantine John Phipps; 30 May 1744; Whitby, Yorkshire, England
- Died: 10 October 1792 (aged 48); Liège, Liège Prince-Bishopric
- Relatives: Constantine Phipps (father)
- Military career
- Allegiance: Great Britain
- Branch: Royal Navy
- Service years: 1759–1792
- Rank: Captain
- Commands: HMS Diligence; HMS Terpsichore; HMS Boreas; HMS Racehorse; HMS Ardent; Lord Commissioner of the Admiralty; HMS Courageux; HMS Leviathan
- Battles: Seven Years' War; Capture of Belle Île; Invasion of Martinique; Siege of Havana; American Revolutionary War; First Battle of Ushant; Second Battle of Ushant; Affair of Fielding and Bylandt

Captain Constantine John Phipps, 2nd Baron Mulgrave, PC, FRS (30 May 1744 – 10 October 1792) was a Royal Navy officer, explorer and politician. He served during the Seven Years' War and the American War of Independence, seeing action in a number of battles and engagements. Inheriting a title, he also went on to have a successful career in Parliament and occupied a number of political offices during his later years.

== Family and early life ==
Phipps was born on 30 May 1744, the eldest son of Constantine Phipps, 1st Baron Mulgrave and his wife, Lepel Hervey, the eldest daughter of John 2nd Baron Hervey of Ickworth and Mary 'Molly' Lepel. Phipps attended Eton College, where he befriended Joseph Banks, the English naturalist, botanist, and later patron of the natural sciences.

== Seven Years' War ==
In January 1759, he joined the 70-gun HMS Monmouth as a cadet under his uncle Captain Augustus Hervey during Hervey's 21-week watch on the French fleet in 1759. Phipps remained with his uncle on the latter's appointment to the 74-gun HMS Dragon in 1761, and was present at the British expedition against Martinique. His good service led to his promotion to lieutenant on 17 March 1762 by Sir George Rodney, and Phipps went on to serve in the siege of Havana.

He was further promoted on 24 November 1763 to command the 12-gun sloop HMS Diligence, moving to the 24-gun sixth rate Terpsichore on 20 June 1765. In 1766, he sailed to Newfoundland as lieutenant on HMS Niger under Captain Sir Thomas Adams. Joseph Banks accompanied him as ship's naturalist. From 1767 to 1768, Phipps commanded HMS Boreas in the English Channel.

== Political career and command ==
Phipps was elected to Parliament in the 1768 general election as Member for the constituency of Lincoln. On 4 June 1773, Phipps set off from Deptford on a voyage towards the North Pole. He had two ships, the Racehorse and the Carcass. Phipps took with him Dr Charles Irving as naturalist and doctor accompanied by Olaudah Equiano, and Israel Lyons (1739–1775) as astronomer. The Carcass was commanded by Skeffington Lutwidge, while one of her midshipmen was a young Horatio Nelson.

They sailed beyond Svalbard to the Seven Islands, but were forced back by the ice and returned to Orford Ness on 17 September. During the voyage, Phipps was the first modern European to describe the polar bear and the ivory gull, which were included in his A Voyage towards the North Pole undertaken ... 1773 (1774).

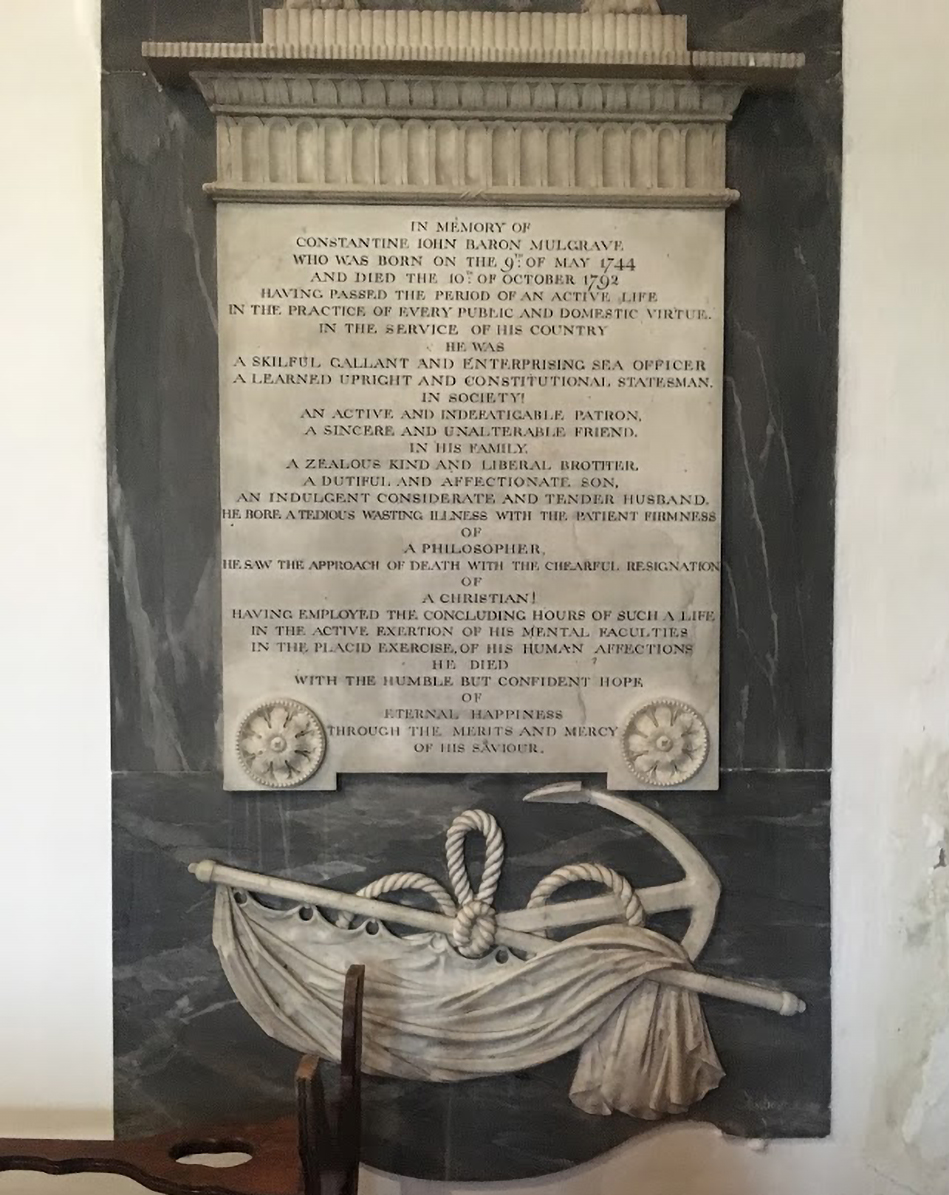
Commemorative plaque for Constantine Phipps at St Oswald's Church, Lythe, North Yorkshire. It records his date of birth as 9 May 1744, at variance with other sources.

On 13 September 1775, he succeeded his father as Baron Mulgrave in the Peerage of Ireland. He became MP for Huntingdon in 1777, and was also appointed as one of the Lords of the Admiralty. Continuing an active naval career, he commissioned the 74-gun HMS Courageux in 1778, and played a leading role in the Battle of Ushant on 27 July that year. Phipps led the attack on the 90-gun Ville de Paris, but the indecisive nature of the engagement meant that the French ship was able to escape.

Phipps returned to Britain and gave evidence at the subsequent court-martial, his evidence favouring Hugh Palliser. The Courageux remained under his command until 1781, with Phipps serving mostly in the Channel under Admirals Charles Hardy, Francis Geary, George Darby and Richard Howe.

In the action of 4 January 1781, he captured the 32-gun French frigate Minerve in heavy weather off Brest. The Courageux was paid off at the end of the American War of Independence, and Phipps went ashore, never to serve at sea again.

== Later life ==
Phipps remained as MP for Huntingdon until 1784, when he became MP for Newark. In April that year, he became Paymaster of the Forces and on 18 May, he was appointed a commissioner for the affairs of India, and one of the Lords of Trade and Plantations, until being forced to resign in 1791 due to ill health.

In 1790, he was made Baron Mulgrave of Mulgrave in the County of York in the Peerage of Great Britain, thus entering the House of Lords. He also was a Fellow of the Royal Society and of the Society of Antiquaries. He once entertained his miners underground in the Blue John Caverns in Castleton, Derbyshire. The particular cavern where they all dined as his guests is now named after him.

He died at Liège on 10 October 1792. The title of Baron Mulgrave in the British peerage then became extinct, though his brother Henry Phipps succeeded him in the Irish barony.

== See also ==
- Phippsøya, the largest island in the Sjuøyane group, is named after him

== Notes ==
Parliament of Great Britain
Preceded by George Monson; Coningsby Sibthorpe	Member of Parliament for Lincoln; 1768–1774; With: Thomas Scrope	Succeeded by Viscount Lumley; Robert Vyner
Preceded by William Montagu; George Wombwell	Member of Parliament for Huntingdon; 1776–1784; With: George Wombwell 1776–1780; Sir Hugh Palliser, Bt 1780–1784	Succeeded by Sir Walter Rawlinson; Lancelot Brown
Preceded by Henry Clinton; John Manners-Sutton	Member of Parliament for Newark; 1784–1790; With: John Manners-Sutton	Succeeded by John Manners-Sutton; William Crosbie
Political offices
Preceded by William Wyndham Grenville	Paymaster of the Forces; 1789–1791; With: Marquess of Graham	Succeeded by Dudley Ryder; Thomas Steele
Peerage of Great Britain
New creation	Baron Mulgrave; 1790–1792	Extinct
Peerage of Ireland
Preceded by Constantine Phipps	Baron Mulgrave; 1775–1792	Succeeded by Henry Phipps
