= Josiah Webbe =

East India Company servant

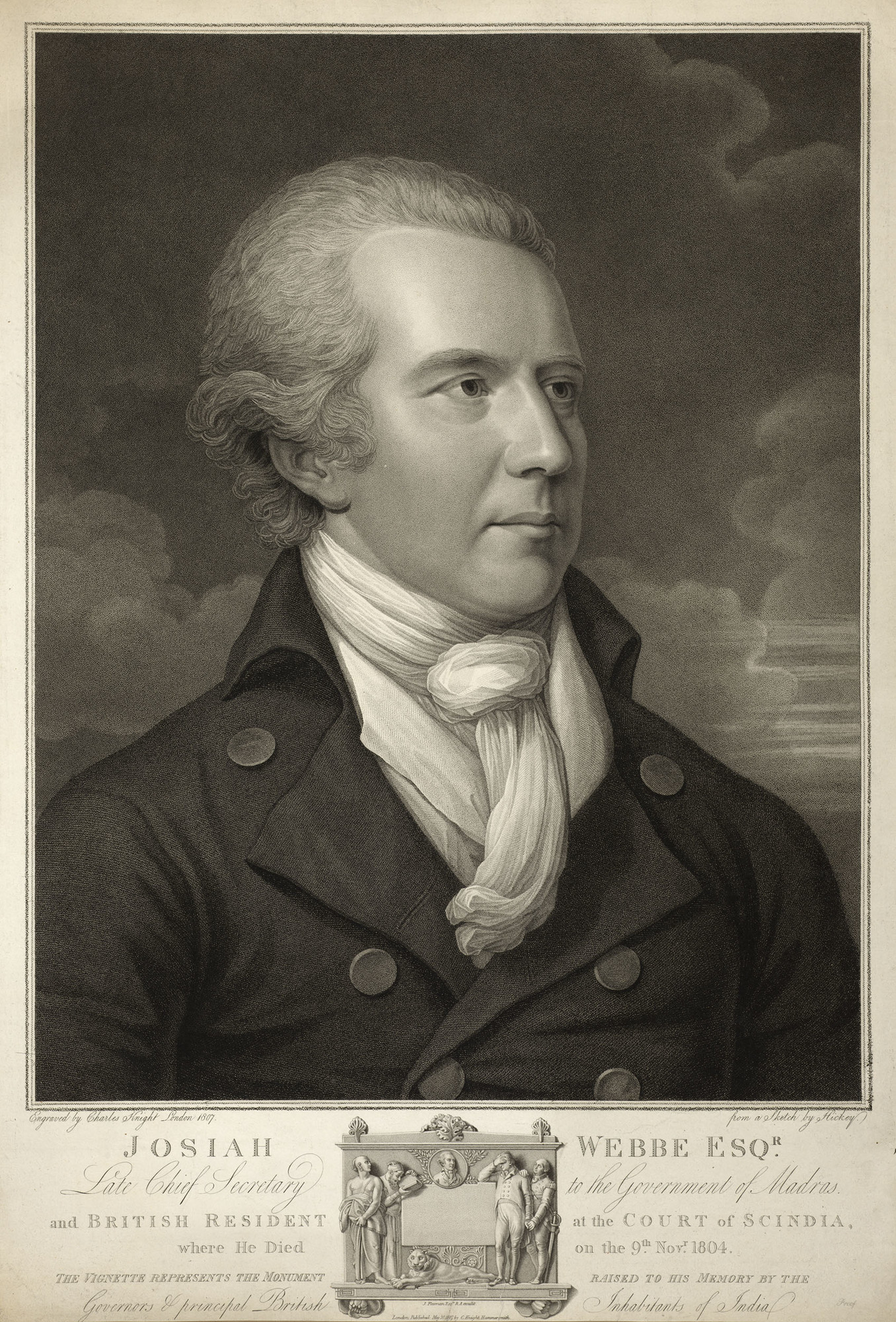
Engraving based on painting by Thomas Hickey

Josiah Webb (April 1767 – 9 November 1804) was an English East India Company servant who worked as Chief Secretary at Madras and as a Resident at Mysore and later in the court of the Maharaja of Scindia.

Webbe was born into the colonial elite of Nevis as the son of George Webb (1744-1804), a wealthy landowner and slaveowner, and Mary Fenton Dasent (1737-1818), whose grandfather John Dasent (1691-1754) and brother John Dasent (1734-1787) were both Chief Justices of Nevis.

He entered the service of the East India Company as a writer on 26 July 1783. His ability to deal with Indian languages made him popular. He advised against hostile actions towards Tipu Sultan. He wrote to General Harris in Madras to follow the 'British policy' of preserving Tipu as a balance against the Marathis and the Nizam and stated that 'I can anticipate none but the most baneful consequences from a war with Tipu.' This displeased Lord Mornington and the directors of the East India Company leading to his removal from the service of Arthur Wellesley. In 1803, he was posted Resident to the newly acquired kingdom of Mysore and the next year, he was posted by Wellesley to the Court of the Maharaja Daulat Rao Scindia in Gwalior. He took up the post but died at Dolaria, near Hoshangabad on the banks of Narmada after a long illness. His position was then occupied by Lord Elphinstone. A monolithic granite obelisk to him was erected at Srirangapatnam by Dewan Purnaiah, and a memorial by John Flaxman was installed at St. Mary's Church in Fort St. George. The memorial has a Brahmin and a Mohameddan on the left and an Englishman on the right. A tiger and lotus are engraved at the bottom.

Unmarried, Webbe left his wealth to his sister Fanny Francklyn (née Webbe) and her son Alexander Allan (1808-1868), who then took up the name and arms of Webbe in lieu of Francklyn.

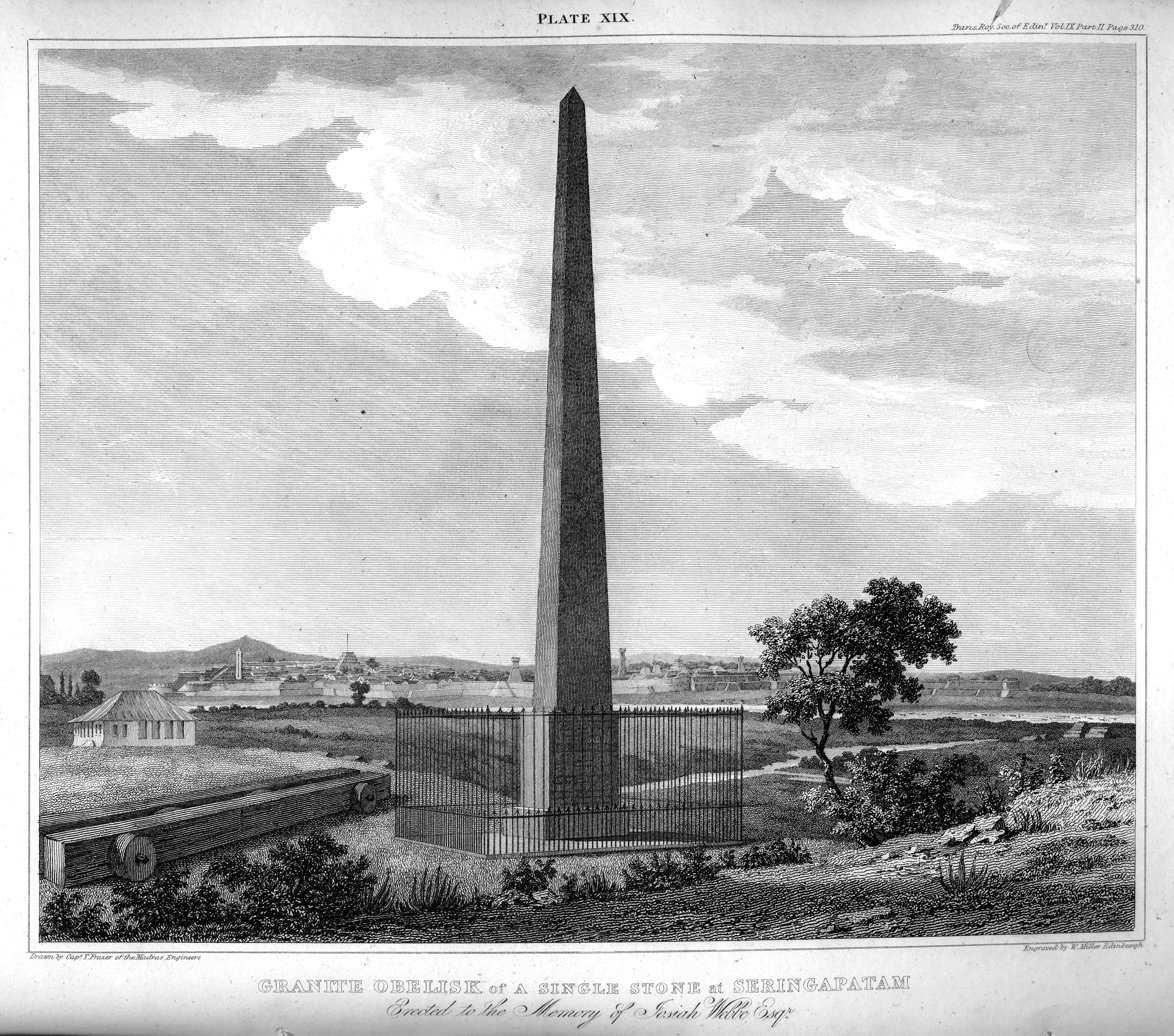
Webbe Memorial - Obelisk at Srirangapatnam

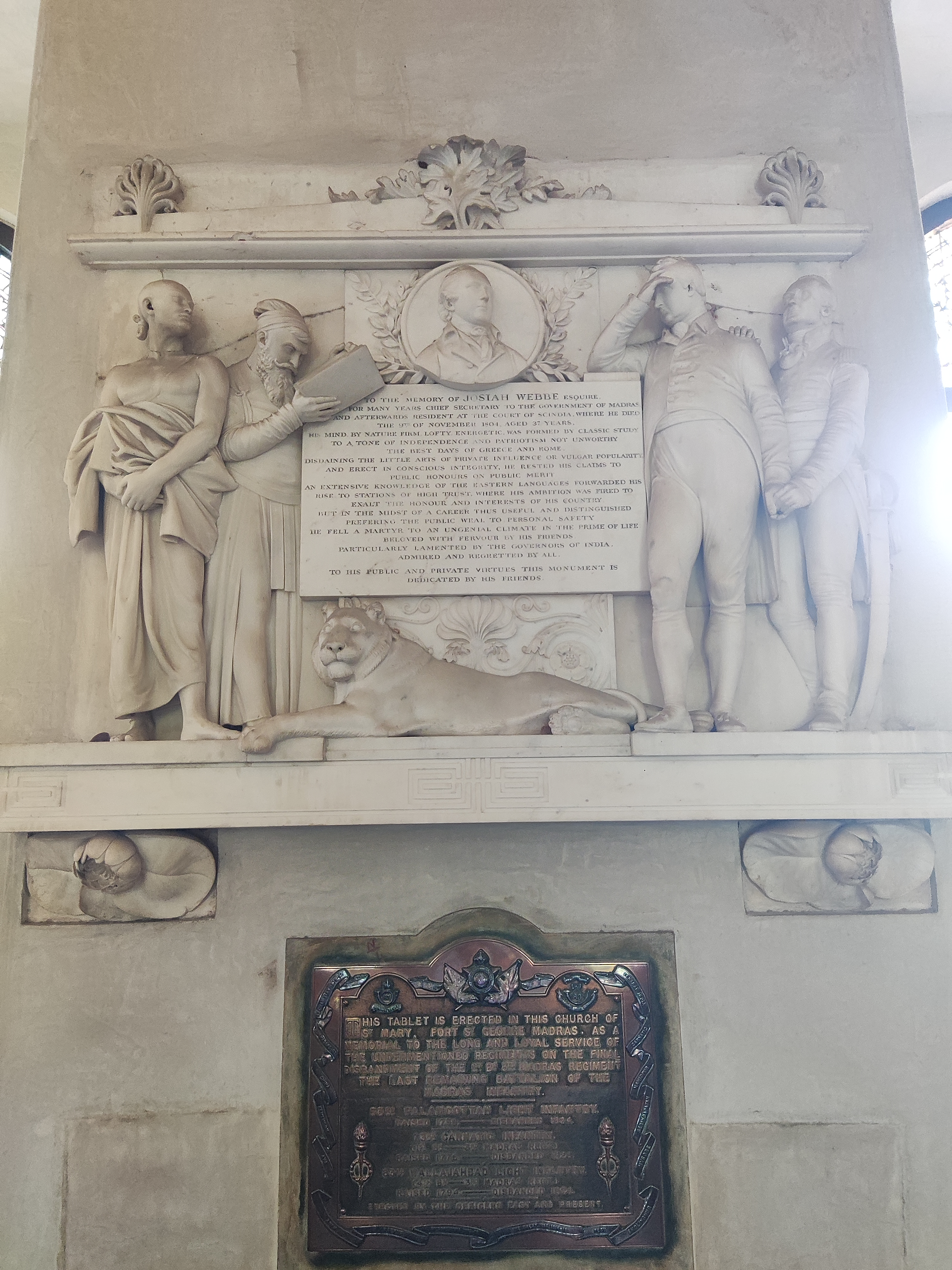
Memorial by John Flaxman
