= Sir Alexander Allan, 1st Baronet =

British painter

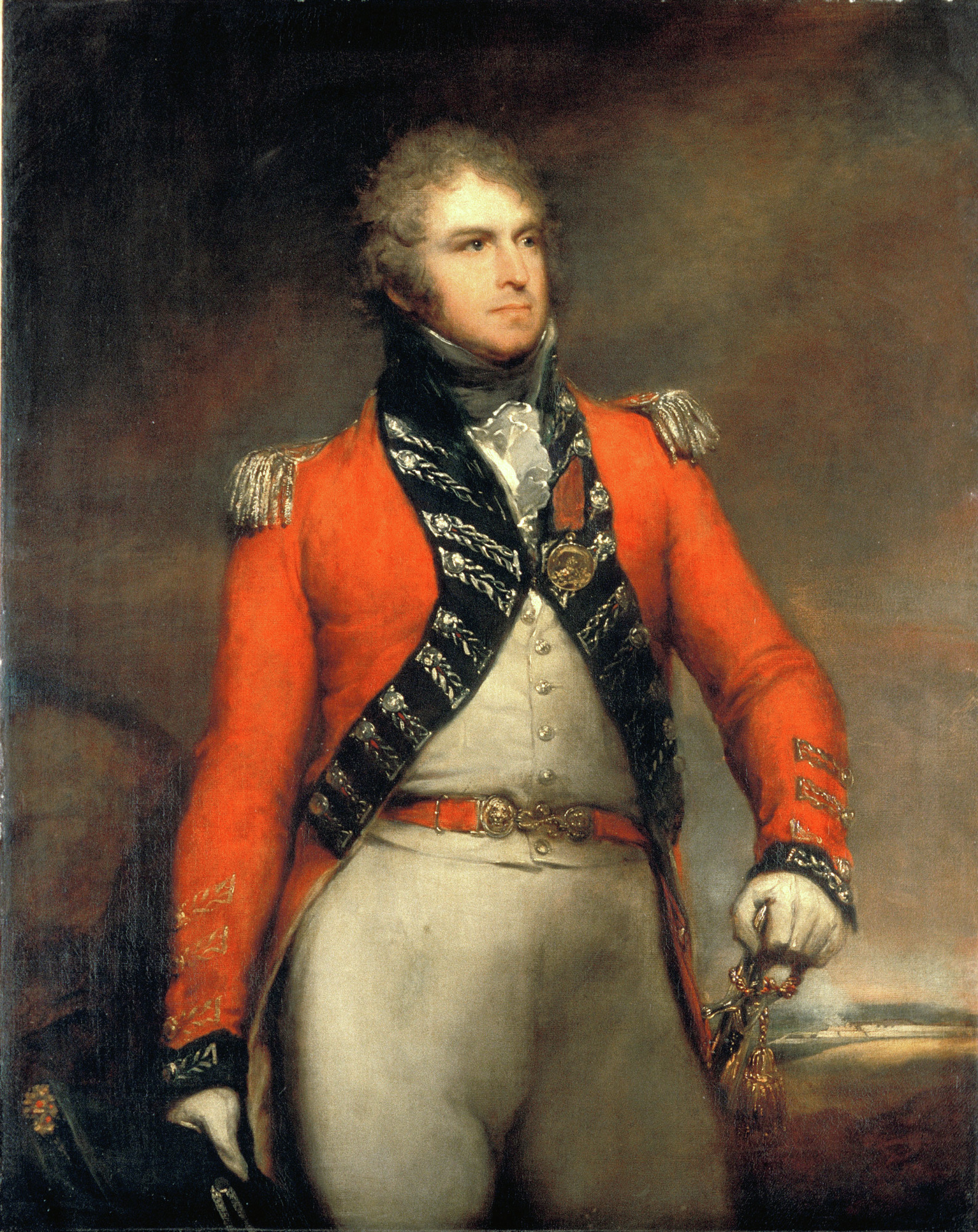
Portrait of Sir Alexander Allan

Sir Alexander Allan, 1st Baronet MP (c. 1764 – 14 September 1820) was a British painter and politician. He worked with the East India Company mainly in India where he joined as a cadet and rose to the position of a major, while also making numerous political connections. He returned to England and became a director of the East India Company in 1814.

== Biography ==
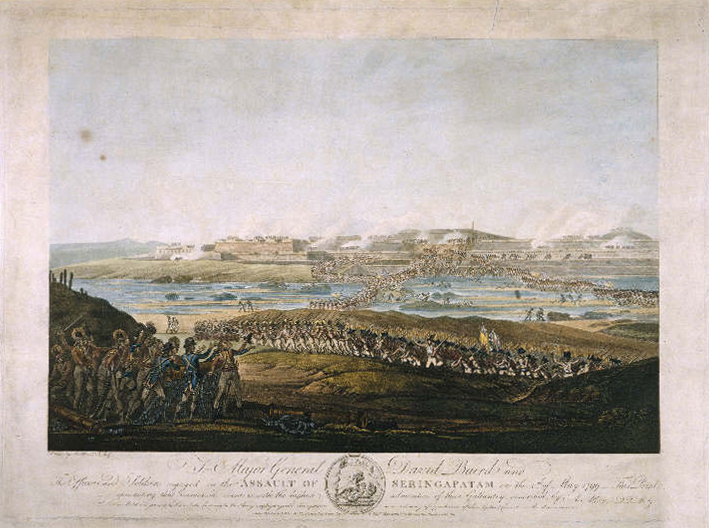
The assault of Seringapatam, a print after Allan

Allan's family origins are not known. He joined the East India Company as a cadet in 1779 and had been promoted to captain when he served in the Fourth Mysore War in 1798 as Deputy Quartermaster-General, serving under Robert Hobart. In 1797, there were complaints at India House that Hobart had helped Allan hold appointments that were incompatible. After the Siege of Seringapatam (1799), Lord Wellesley wrote to Hobart that Allan had tried to save the family of Tippo Sultan and helped induce the army to surrender. Wellesley appointed Allan as an honorary aide-de-camp. Allan painted numerous water colours of the campaign.

On his return to England shortly after 1799, he was assistant by Hobart who had become a secretary of state under Henry Addington. Addington selected him to stand for election at Winchelsea. He was elected Member of Parliament (MP) for Berwick-upon-Tweed from 1803 to 1806 and 1807 to 1820. He claimed that he had seen more of the Carnatic than any other European. He was a director of the East India Company from 1814 to 1817 and 1819 to his death.

He was made a baronet on 18 September 1819, of Kingsgate in the County of Kent. The title became extinct upon his death in 1820. He never married and left a large part of his wealth to Fanny Franklyn, the wife of Henry Franklyn of Copthall House, near Luton, Bedfordshire, with remainder to her son Alexander Allen Franklyn, later Webbe. He mentioned a relative named Jane Smith, a widowed aunt who lived at Beaumont Place, Shepherds Bush with two daughters Jane and Margaret.

Parliament of the United Kingdom
Preceded by Thomas Hall; John Fordyce	Member of Parliament for Berwick-upon-Tweed; 1803–1806; With: Francis Sitwell	Succeeded by Sir John Callender, Bt; Alexander Tower
Preceded by Sir John Callender, Bt; Alexander Tower	Member of Parliament for Berwick-upon-Tweed; 1807–1820; With: Sir Alexander Lockhart, Bt to 1812; Henry St Paul from 1812	Succeeded by Viscount Ossulston; Sir David Milne
Baronetage of the United Kingdom
New creation	Baronet of Kingsgate, Kent; 1819–1820	Extinct
Preceded by Baillie baronets	Allan baronets of Kingsgate; 18 September 1819	Succeeded by Robinson baronets
