= Richard Carpenter (theologian) =

English cleric and writer (1575–1627)

- Born: baptised 16 February 1575/6 (not certain); Phillack, Cornwall, England
- Died: 18 December 1627; Sherwell, Devon, England
- Occupation: Clerk in holy orders
- Known for: Theology

Richard Carpenter (1575 – 18 December 1627) was an English clergyman and theological writer.

== Biography ==
He was probably born in Cornwall in 1575. He matriculated at Exeter College, Oxford, on 28 May 1592, and took his degrees of B.A. on 19 February 1596, B.D. 25 June 1611, and D.D. 10 February 1616–17. He was elected to a Cornish fellowship at his college on 30 June 1596, and retained it until 30 June 1606; under the advice of Thomas Holland, the Rector, he studied theology, and became noted as a preacher.

In 1606 he was appointed by Sir Robert Chichester to the rectories of Sherwell and Loxhore, near Barnstaple, and it has been suggested that he was the Richard Carpenter who from 1601 to 1626 held the vicarage of Cullompton. His will, dated in 1625, describes him as pastor of Sherwell (not Sheviock, as per will abstract), Devon.

He died on 18 December 1627, and was buried in the chancel of Loxhore Church, where a monument was erected to his memory.

== Works ==
Carpenter's literary productions were confined to theology. He was the author of:

- A Sermon Preached at the Funeral Solemnities of Sir Arthur Ackland, 9 January 1612.
- A Pastoral Charge at the Triennial Visitation of the Bishop of Exon. at Barnstaple, 1616.
- Christ's Larum Bell of Love resounded, 1616.
- The Conscionable Christian, three sermons preached before the judges of the circuit in 1620, London, 1623.

His learning is praised by Charles Fitzgeoffry in his Affaniae, and two letters addressed to him by Degory Wheare in 1603 and 1621 are in the Epistolae Eucharistice with Wheare's Pietas erga Benefactores, 1628. Some verses by Carpenter are printed in the Funebre Officium in Memoriam Elizabethae Angliae reginae of the University of Oxford, 1603, and in the collection (Pietas erga Jacobum Angliae regem) with which that body in the same year welcomed the new king.

== Family ==
While he was a tutor at Oxford, Christopher Trevelyan was among his pupils, and through this introduction Carpenter married Susanna, born about 1688, daughter of Sir John Trevelyan. his pupil's youngest sister, and obtained his benefice from Sir Robert Chichester. The marriage took place at Nettlecombe, Somerset, on 1 September 1606.

The children of Richard and Susanna Carpenter were:

- Susanna Carpenter, baptised Nettlecombe, 28 October 1607
- John Carpenter, born c. 1608
- Mary Carpenter, born c. 1610
- Richard Carpenter, born c. 1612
- Ann Carpenter, born c. 1614
- Elizabeth Carpenter, born c. 1616
- Edward Carpenter, born c. 1618
- Sarah Carpenter, born c. 1620
- Thomas Carpenter, born c. 1622

Note: There was no son named William found in the Parish records nor was a William cited in the father's will.

== Other people called Richard Carpenter ==
This Richard Carpenter was not the Richard Carpenter of Amesbury, Wiltshire, father of William Carpenter of Providence, Rhode Island.

Nor should he be confused with Richard Carpenter (vicar of Poling). This Richard was at Kings College, Cambridge, in 1622, twice lived in Europe for a few years and was vicar of Poling from 1635 to about 1642. He married in middle age and finally settled not in Amesbury but Aylesbury, in Buckinghamshire, where he died about 1670.
