= Charles Irving (surgeon) =

Scottish naval surgeon and inventor

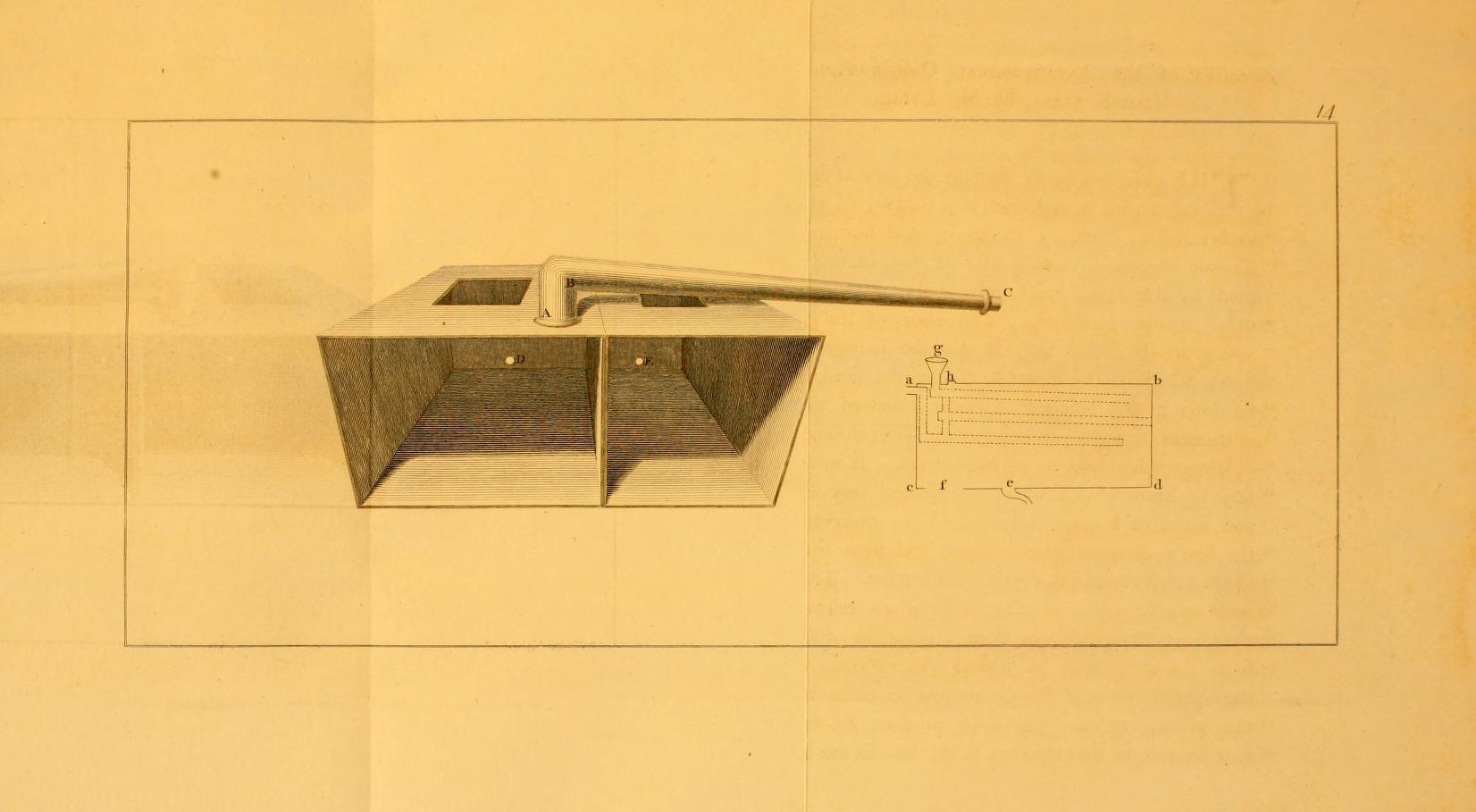
- Irving's apparatus for the distillation of seawater, published in 1774.
- Born: Holywood, Dumfries and Galloway
- Occupations: Naval surgeon; Inventor; Colonial entrepreneur
- Known for: Inventing a marine seawater distillation apparatus used by James Cook and Constantine John Phipps
- Parent(s): William Irving of Gribton and Katherine Menzies of Enoch
- Relatives: Thomas Irving (brother)

Charles Irving (fl. 1768–1781) was a Scottish naval surgeon and inventor. In 1770, he introduced a method for distillation of seawater to the Royal Navy, and was awarded the sum of £5,000 (equivalent to £790,000 in 2025) for his method in 1772. His apparatus for distilling seawater was used on the second voyage of James Cook and on the 1773 expedition by Constantine John Phipps towards the North Pole, in which Irving participated both as surgeon and as scientific collaborator of Phipps. He was later involved in British colonial enterprises in Central America that included an attempt to establish a crown colony on the Mosquito Shore, but his plans were thwarted by Spanish intervention.

== Early life ==
Irving was the son of William Irving of Gribton (c. 1738–1800), at Gribton estate, Holywood, Dumfriesshire, Scotland, and Katherine Menzies of Enoch. One of his brothers was civil servant Thomas Irving. It is not known how Charles Irving became a surgeon, and he was not licensed by the Royal College of Physicians. In 1768, while living in Pall Mall, London, he employed freedman Olaudah Equiano (also known as Gustavus Vassa) as a hairdresser from February to May. According to Equiano's autobiography, The Interesting Narrative of the Life of Olaudah Equiano, Irving was an "excellent master" who allowed him to attend schools in the evening.

== Distillation of seawater ==
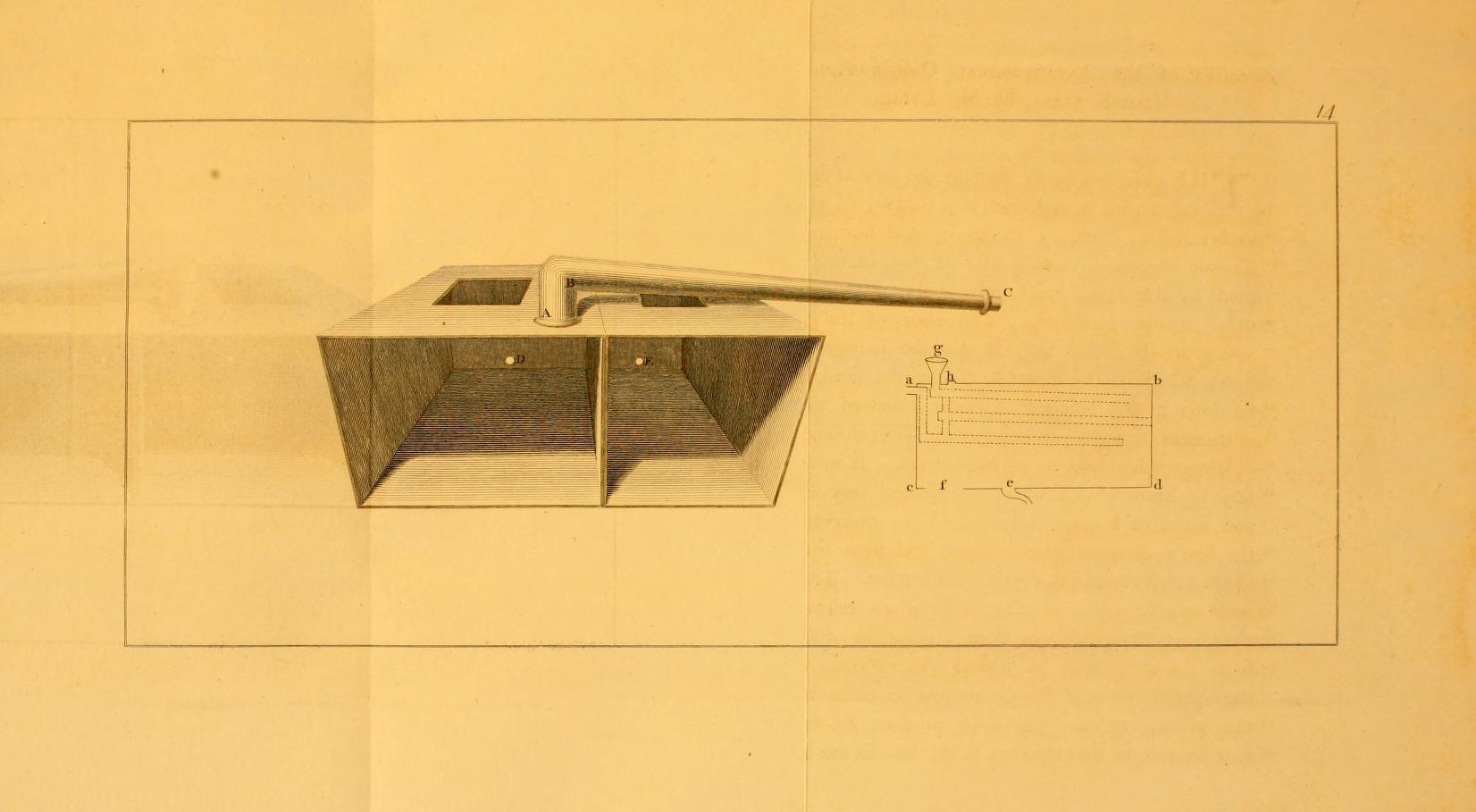
Charles Irving's apparatus for distilling seawater

Irving introduced a method for distillation of seawater to the Royal Navy in 1770. The following January, while Irving was junior surgeon on HMS Arrogant, he demonstrated his apparatus to the Admiralty at Spithead. Although Irving's device was very similar to one proposed earlier by James Lind, the latter co-signed a certificate declaring the method to be both new and efficient. Lord Sandwich, the First Lord of the Admiralty, had two bottles of this water analyzed by Richard Watson, who made experiments comparing Irving's water with other fresh and distilled water and found it to be "not wholly free from saline particles; but it probably contains them in so small a portion, as to not injure its salubrity to any sensible degree." The scientist Joseph Priestley tasted some of the water during a dinner hosted by Hugh Percy, 1st Duke of Northumberland and reported it was "perfectly sweet, but ... wanted the briskness and spirit of fresh spring water". Irving was awarded £5,000 (equivalent to £790,000 in 2025) by Parliament for his method on 11 May 1772.

The distillation apparatus, which allowed sea water to be distilled while cooking food, was installed on both ships of James Cook's second voyage, HMS Resolution and HMS Adventure. During the preparations for the voyage, Cook additionally tested and rejected a new fire-hearth also proposed by Irving. When naturalist Joseph Banks withdrew from the expedition, Irving visited Johann Reinhold Forster on 26 May 1772 and asked him whether he would like to go instead. When Forster agreed, Irving relayed this to Philip Stephens, First Secretary of the Admiralty, starting the process that ended with Forster's appointment as naturalist on Cook's second voyage. During the journey, Forster investigated the efficiency of Irving's apparatus and commented at length in his journals about prior achievements of others, and also made some suggestions for improvement. In his journal, not published until 1982, he commented "But [facts about Lind's method] seem not to have fallen under the knowledge of the Members of the House of Commons, or Mr Irwin [sic] must have found a method of representing his way of distilling fresh water from Seawater as a quite new one, or both may be the case."

== Expedition towards the North Pole ==
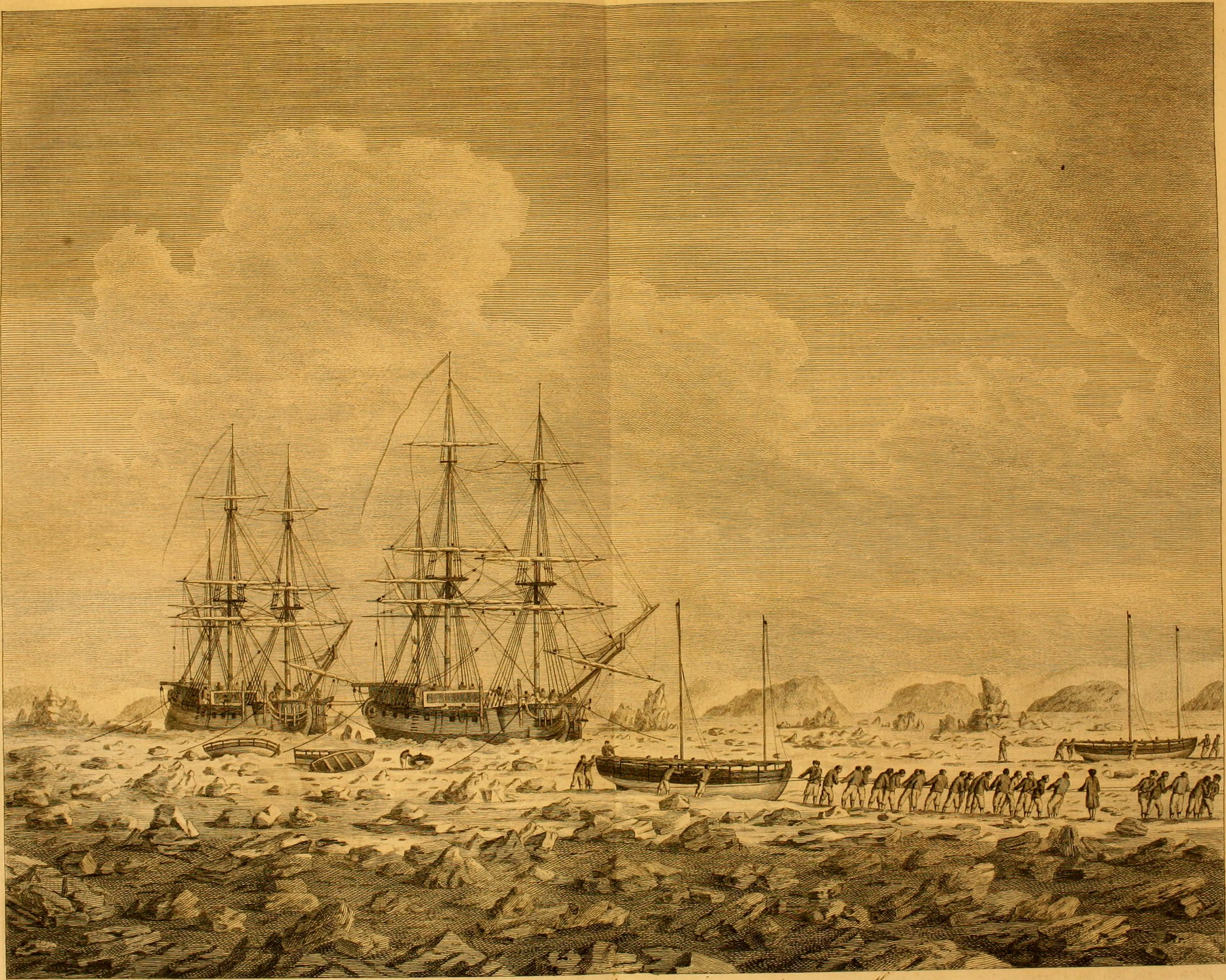
HMS Racehorse and HMS Carcass in the ice

In 1773, on the initiative of Daines Barrington, who adhered to the belief of Samuel Engel that there was an ice-free region near the pole, Sandwich initiated an expedition with the aim of reaching the North Pole. HMS Racehorse, commanded by Constantine John Phipps, and HMS Carcass, commanded by Skeffington Lutwidge, were to pass between Spitsbergen and Greenland and sail as far north as possible, while keeping away from the coasts. Should they reach the pole, they were to return home. Irving, who was described by Joseph Banks as "well acquainted with the desiderata of Zoology", was employed as surgeon on the Racehorse, and Equiano joined him, employed both as an able seaman by the Navy and as Irving's personal assistant. Irving's apparatus was successfully used on board, operated by Equiano. Irving also assisted Phipps in measurements of the water temperature in different depths, using a thermometer invented by Lord Charles Cavendish, and, realising the inadequacies of their methods, devised an insulated bottle, called the Irving bottle. However, this method also did not provide accurate measurements. Irving used a barometer to measure the heights of mountains in Spitsbergen and on Amsterdam Island. The expedition made it as far north as 80°48′N, but could not advance further due to ice.

Phipps's 1774 report on the expedition, A voyage towards the North Pole, contains an appendix written by Irving about the distillation apparatus that is dismissive of Lind's contribution, causing the latter to publish a response refuting some of Irving's claims.

== Colonial ventures and death ==
In 1775, Irving hosted in London a delegation of Mosquito Indians from the British-controlled Mosquito Shore and attempted to become superintendent of the territory. Irving had the ambition to establish a British crown colony with 30,000 colonists on the Mosquito Shore, but Lord Dartmouth was careful not to support this plan openly, opting to encourage private investments and the purchase of land from the Mosquito king instead. On 13 November 1775, Irving and his business associate, Alexander Blair, accompanied by Equiano and the Mosquito Indians who had travelled to London, sailed from London to the West Indies on the Morning Star, arriving in Jamaica in January 1776. There, aided by Equiano's language abilities, they bought recently arrived slaves from West Africa, probably slaves from Bonny transported on the African Queen, with the eventual plan being to establish a sugar plantation supervised by Equiano. After their arrival at Black River, the Morning Star was seized by Spanish guarda costa privateers. Irving and Blair, having lost £3,723 (equivalent to £528,000 in 2025), petitioned the British government to have the ship returned but failed. In 1779–1781, Irving took part in British invasions of modern Nicaragua, involving the Mosquito people and finding other routes than that of the San Juan Expedition but the British soon became less interested in the Mosquito shore. Irving is reported to have died in 1794 in Jamaica, a year repeated in various sources, although Equiano erroneously claimed he died from eating poisoned fish in 1776 or 1777. Benjamin Moseley called him "the late Doctor Charles Irving" as early as 1787 and the 1791 Statistical Account of Scotland mentions him in the past tense. The website of the "Equiano's World" project at York University, directed by Paul Lovejoy, states "died 1780s".

== Name and misidentification ==
Irving, whose name also appears in other forms, including Irvine and Irwin, has sometimes been confused with Christopher Irving, who was given £500 by the Board of Longitude for his invention of the marine chair, a device to help with astronomy at sea. However, Christopher Irving died in 1764 in Barbados.
