= Samuel Engel =

Swiss scientist (1702–1784)

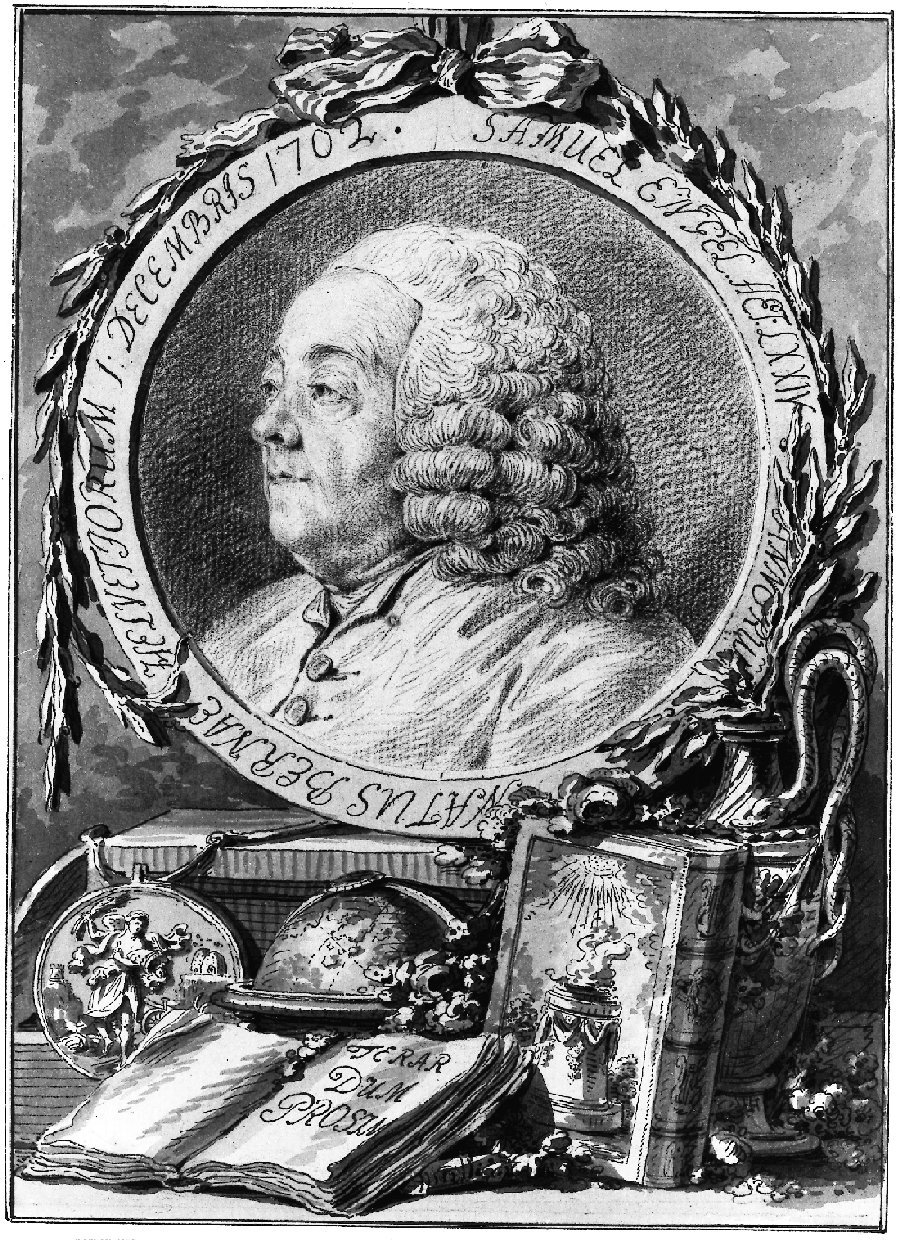
Samuel Engel, 1776 wash drawing by Balthasar Anton Dunker

Samuel Engel (2 December 1702 – 26 March 1784) was a Swiss librarian, civil servant, economist and agronomist working in Bern who introduced innovations in several fields. The son of a Landvogt, he studied at the University of Bern before starting a career in administration. In 1736, he became head librarian of the city library of Bern. He assembled a large collection of rare books that was intended for the library, but had to sell them at a loss. In 1745, he became a member of the Grand Council of Bern; from 1748, he was a Landvogt himself. He introduced several innovations in forestry and agriculture such as promoting potato farming in Vaud.

A keen amateur geographer, Engel was convinced of the existence of a Northeast Passage and published several influential books about the Arctic. His theories about an ice-free polar sea influenced the British Admiralty's decision in favour of the 1773 Phipps expedition towards the North Pole.

== Early life and family ==
Engel was born in Bern in the Old Swiss Confederacy. His parents were Burkhard Engel (1662–1750), Landvogt of the Canton of Bern in Frienisberg Abbey, and Rosina Fischer (died 1752). The physician, naturalist and poet Albrecht von Haller was a cousin and a close friend. Engel studied at the Hohe Schule (Note: The Hohe Schule was a predecessor of the University of Bern) from 1718 to 1722, preparing for a career in the civil service. After some travels, he passed the exam as a notary in 1726.

In 1725, Engel married Susanna Rosina Fischer, the daughter of Johann Friedrich Fischer, the Landvogt of Saanen. They had nine children.

== Professional career ==
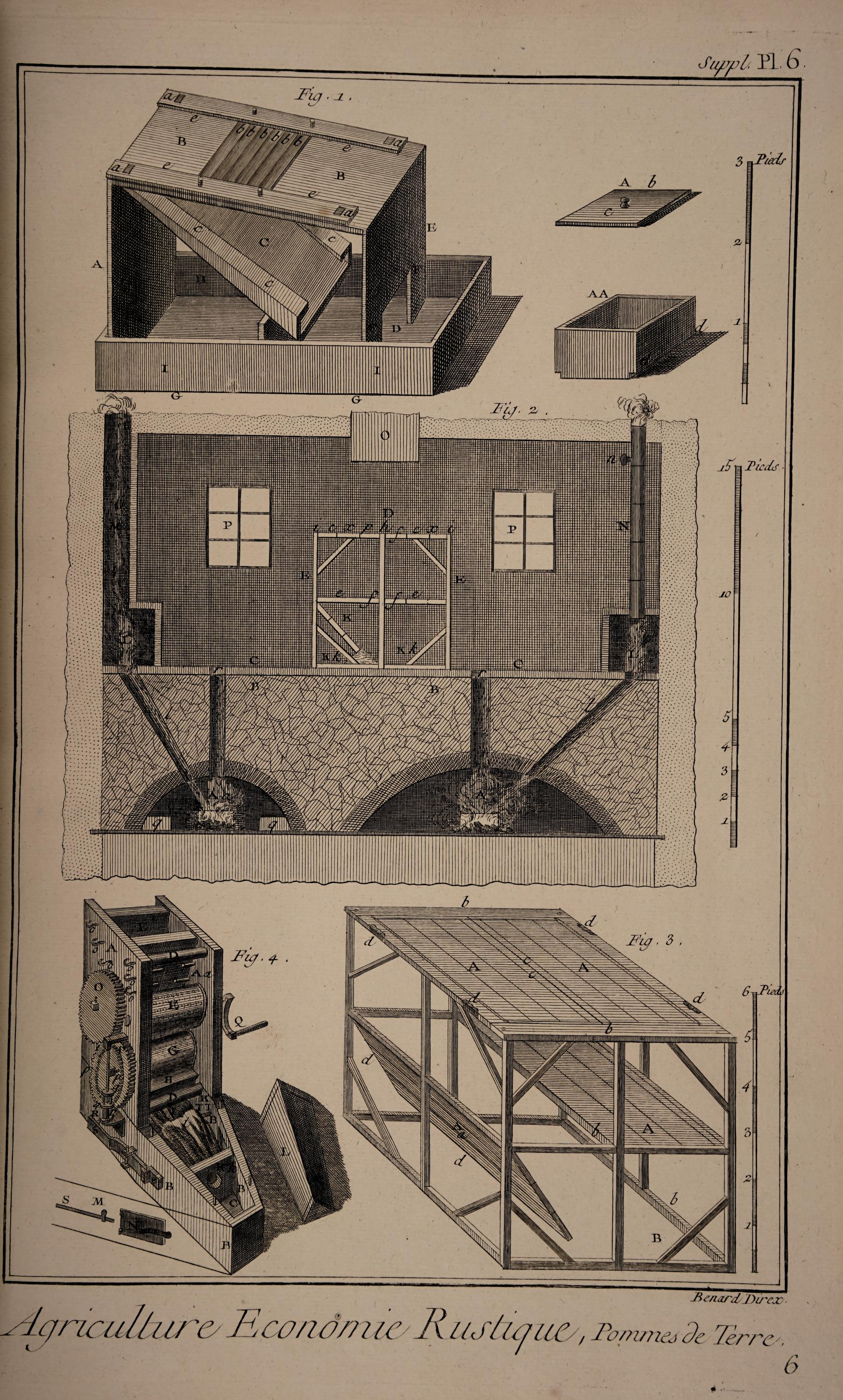
Devices to produce potato flour, from Engel's contributions to the Suite du Recueil de planches, sur les sciences, les arts libéraux et les arts méchaniques

Engel began his career in 1724, when he held a position as an administrator for orphanages. From 1736 to 1748, he was head librarian of the city library, which was modernised under his leadership. A bibliophile and collector, he bought many rare books from all across Europe including 116 incunables out of his own pocket, expecting to be able to sell them to the city for the library. When the city council only purchased a few select books, Engel started having financial troubles and had to find other buyers for his collection. He produced an auction catalogue, Bibliotheca selectissima sive Catalogus Librorum in omni genere Scientiarum rarissimorum ('The most select library or the catalogue of the rarest books in all kinds of sciences'), that appeared in January 1744. By June of that year, more than 600 of the catalogues had been shipped out all over Europe; the planned location for the auction was the trade fair city of Leipzig. However, the plans for the auction fell through, and Engel was forced to sell the collection at a loss to the collector Heinrich von Bünau for 4,000 thalers, a sum that had been negotiated down from an original price of 6,000 thalers. As a librarian, Engel started the use of alphabetised catalogues and pioneered facsimile with a 1746 edition of the Carmen de motibus Siculis. He was elected a member of the Grand Council of Bern in 1745 and was Landvogt in Aarberg from 1748 to 1754 and in Échallens from 1760 to 1765, respectively.

He worked to improve agriculture and forestry, was one of the founders of the Ökonomische Gesellschaft ('Economic Society') in 1759, and introduced potato farming to the people of Vaud in Nyon in 1770/71, in response to widespread famines that had started in 1770. His contributions to agriculture included policies to deal with cockchafers and suggestions to improve the storage of grain.

Engel died in Bern on 26 March 1784.

== Geography ==
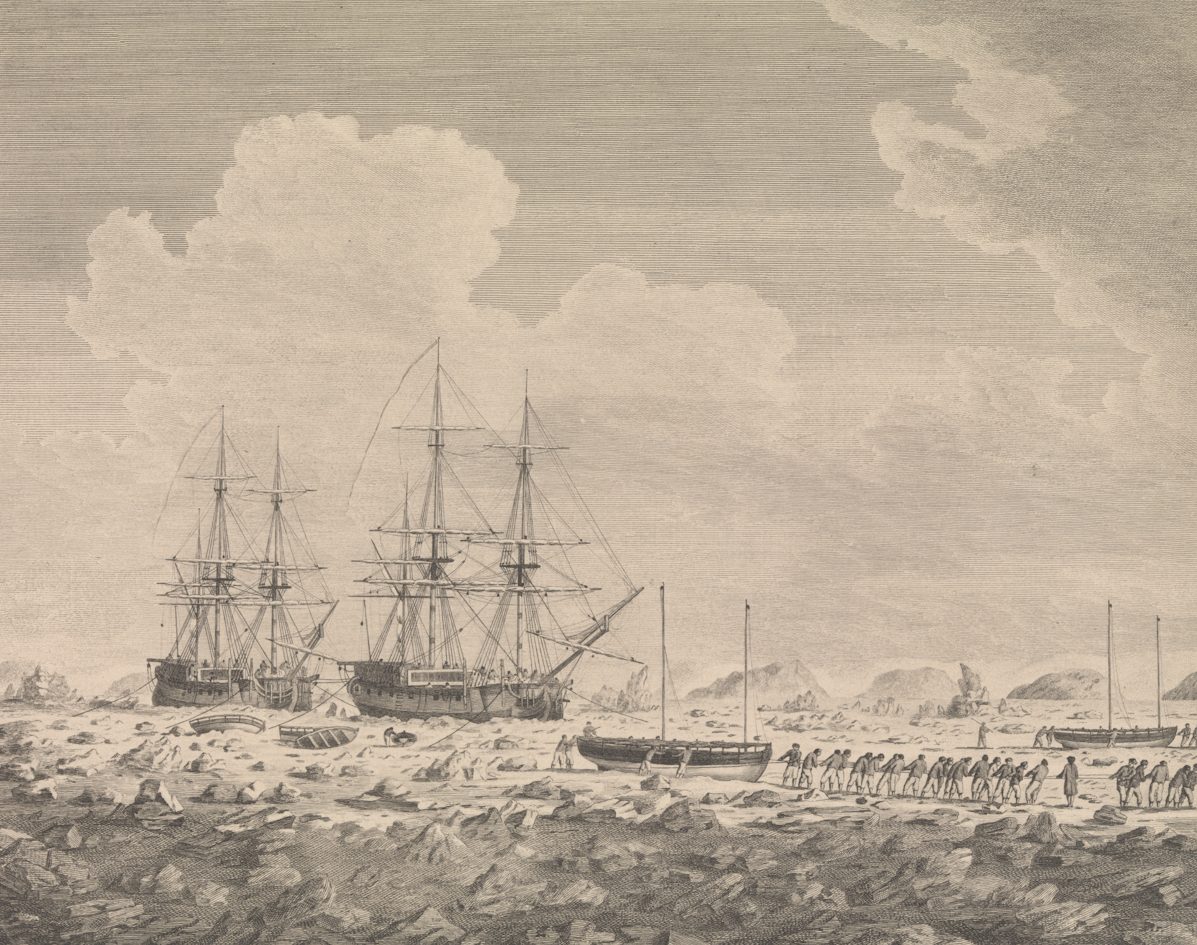
HMS Racehorse and HMS Carcass stuck in the ice on 7 August 1773

From his youth, Engel was interested in the geography of North America, and he collected many relevant rare books. From at least 1735, when he published a relevant letter, he was interested in the question of the existence of a land bridge between North America and Asia. He closely followed news of the Great Northern Expedition, in particular the reports of Johann Georg Gmelin, who was in contact with his cousin and friend Albrecht von Haller.

Despite the observations published by Gmelin, Engel was convinced that an ice free Northeast Passage existed, and tried unsuccessfully to persuade the British Admiralty to send an expedition. The theory was that sea water could not freeze, so any ice in the polar sea must originate from freshwater rivers and be seasonal. Engel's 1765 book Mémoires et observations géographiques et critiques sur la situation des pays septentrionaux de l'Asie et de l'Amerique, which suggested the existence of a vast empty sea near the North Pole, had a great influence in England and France.

The Royal Society's vice president Daines Barrington, who was a follower of Engel's theories, wrote to the First Lord of the Admiralty, Lord Sandwich, in January 1773 and suggested an expedition to the North Pole. The Admiralty quickly started preparations, and the ships HMS Racehorse and HMS Carcass (commanded by Constantine John Phipps and Skeffington Lutwidge, respectively) were sent on the 1773 Phipps expedition towards the North Pole. The Admiralty's instructions for Phipps from 25 May 1773 stated he should "proceed up to the North Pole or as far towards it as you are able, carefully avoiding the errors of former navigators by keeping as much as possible in the open sea, and as nearly upon a meridian to the said Pole as the ice or other obstructions you meet with will admit of. If you arrive at the Pole and should even find the sea so open as to admit of a free navigation on the opposite meridian you are not to proceed any further ..." However, the expedition got stuck in ice near Svalbard and only extricated itself after great difficulties.

Despite this, Engel and Barrington continued to insist that an ice free polar sea existed. Engel later translated Phipps' report of the voyage, A voyage towards the North Pole, into German as Reise nach dem Nordpol: Auf Befehl Ihro Königl. Großbrittannischen Majestät. Unternommen im Jahr 1773. In his 1777 book Neuer Versuch über die Lage der nördlichen Gegenden von Asia und Amerika, und dem Versuch eines Wegs durch die Nordsee nach Indien, he accused the Russian government of falsifying maps and defended his theories about the Northeast Passage.

Engel contributed articles on the geography of Northern Asia and America for Charles-Joseph Panckoucke's supplement to Denis Diderot's Encyclopédie. He also wrote an article about the cultivation and culinary use of the potato. In total, he contributed seven articles to volumes I–IV.
