= 1773 Phipps expedition towards the North Pole =

Royal Navy expedition

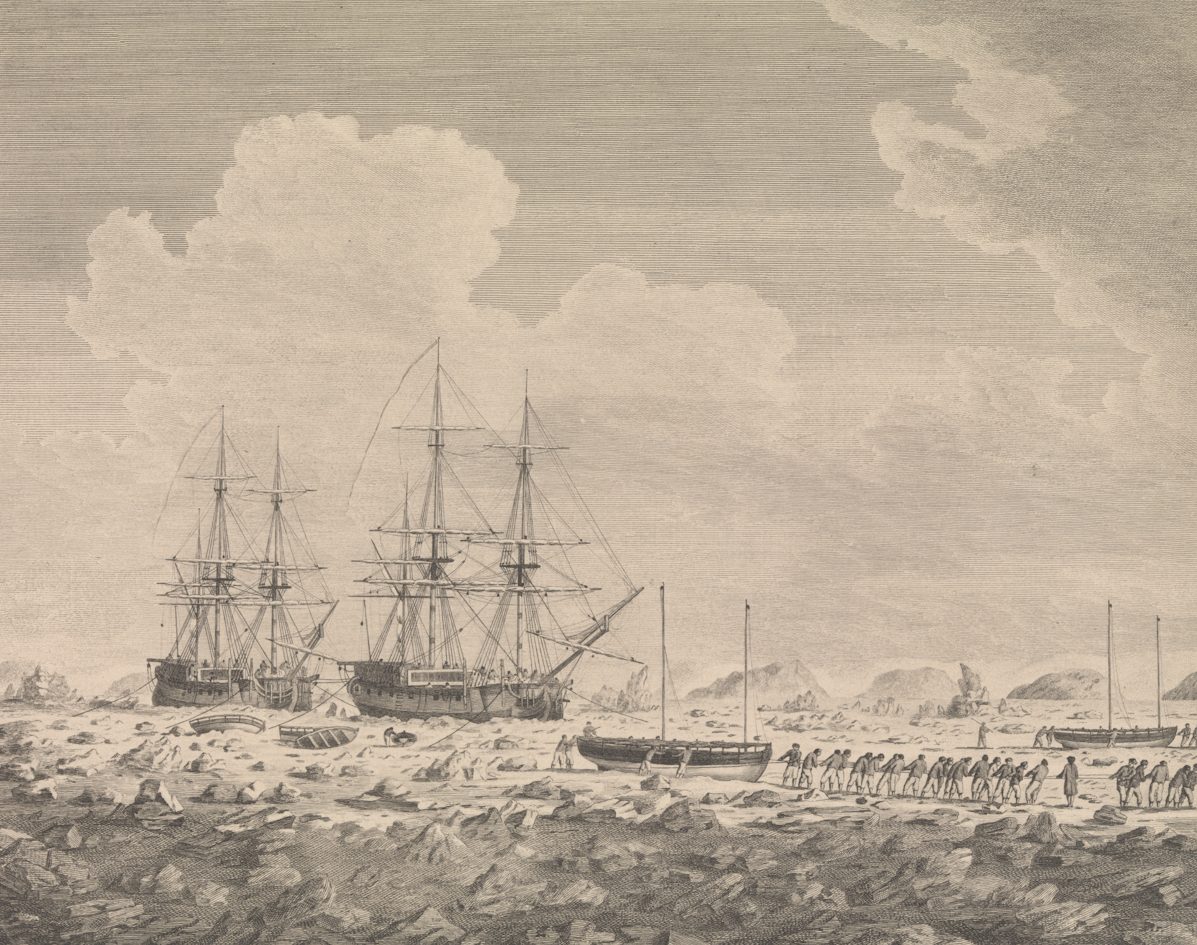
HMS Racehorse and HMS Carcass stuck in the ice on 7 August 1773

The 1773 Phipps expedition towards the North Pole was a Royal Navy expedition suggested by the Royal Society and especially its vice president Daines Barrington, who believed in an ice-free Open Polar Sea. Two bomb vessels, HMS Racehorse and HMS Carcass, were modified for greater protection against ice and sailed towards the North Pole in the summer of 1773 under the commands of Constantine Phipps and Skeffington Lutwidge. The ships became stuck in ice near Svalbard. The report of the journey, published by Phipps in 1774, contained the first scientific descriptions of the polar bear, ivory gull, and naked sea butterfly.

== Background ==
In January 1773, on the initiative of the Royal Society's vice president Daines Barrington, the Society's Secretary, Matthew Maty, sent a letter to Lord Sandwich, the First Lord of the Admiralty, suggesting a voyage to the North Pole. Barrington had been influenced by the writings of the Swiss geographer Samuel Engel, who had suggested in his 1765 book Memoires et observations geographiques et critiques sur la situation des pays septentrionaux de l'Asie et de l'Amerique the existence of a vast empty sea near the North Pole. Engel's explanation for the sea ice found in the Arctic was that most of it came from rivers, and so would only be found close to land. Sandwich, a friend of Daines Barrington, proposed the expedition to King George III, "which his Majesty was pleased to direct should be immediately undertaken".

== Preparations ==
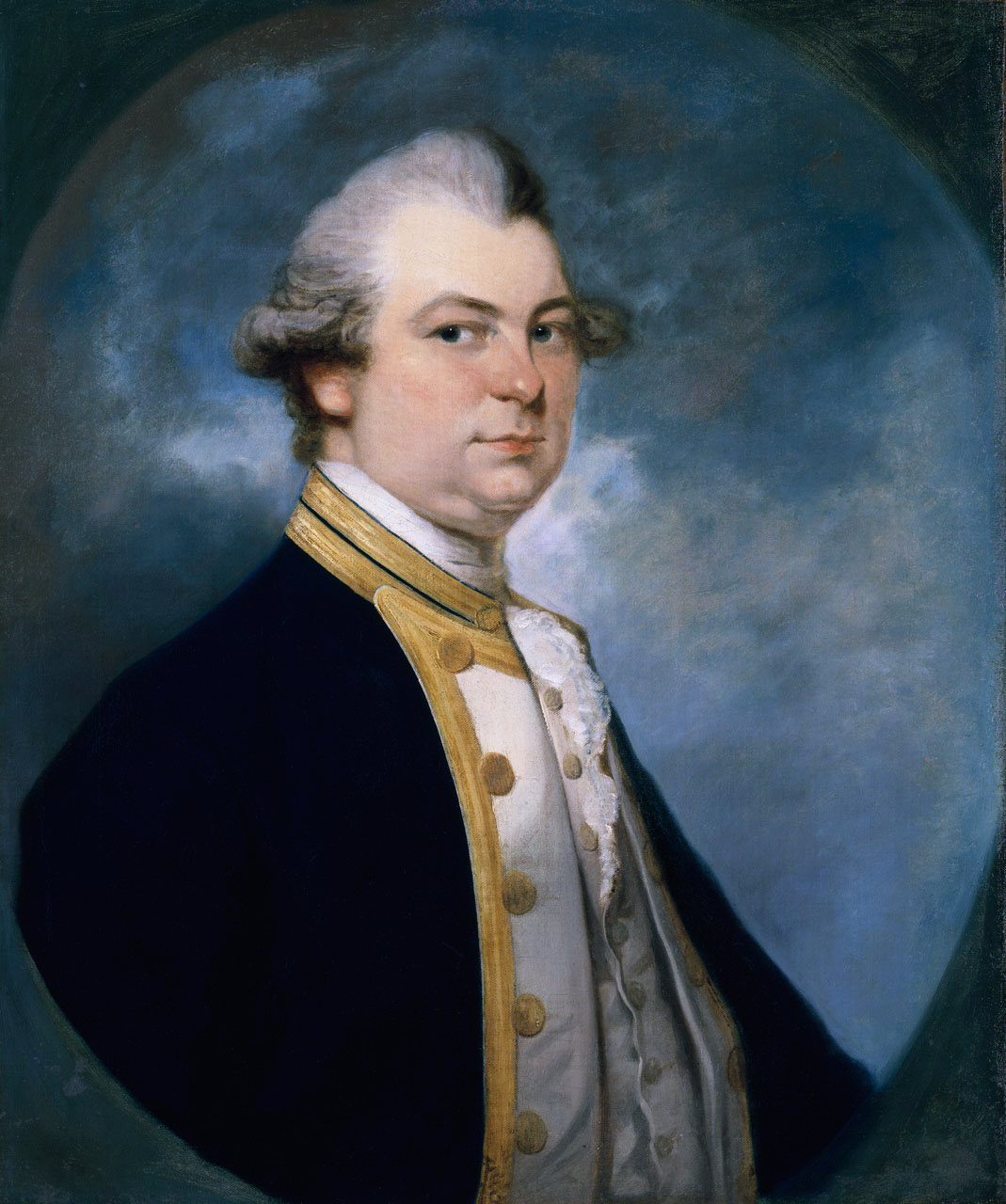
Portrait of Phipps by Ozias Humphry

Constantine Phipps volunteered for the expedition and was appointed its commander. For ships, the Admiralty chose bomb vessels, ships designed to carry heavy mortars that could attack coastal defences, as these had very strong hulls and were also not required during peace time. The bomb vessel HMS Racehorse was chosen as the expedition ship and modified at Deptford Dockyard in March and April 1773. A second bomb vessel, HMS Carcass, under the command of Skeffington Lutwidge since June 1771, was refitted at Sheerness Dockyard, with both ships provided with additional protection against ice.

=== Ships ===
Original plans for HMS Carcass, 1758

Racehorse had originally been a French ship, the Marquis de Vaudreuil until she was captured by the Royal Navy during the Seven Years' War and renamed HMS Racehorse on 5 May 1757. She had three masts and carried 18 guns, and was rated as a sloop. In 1759, Racehorse took part in the Siege of Quebec. In 1772, the ship was used to patrol the Strait of Dover. When the Navy Board instructed Deptford Dockyard to adapt the ship for the voyage towards the North Pole, the instructions stated she was "to be dismantled as far as necessary". Extensive modifications were made: sheathing planking was installed as protection against ice, the forecastle was lengthened, the bomb beds and their support structure were removed, storerooms were built, a new deck was laid, and extra hull bracing was added to the bows. The second ship, HMS Carcass, had been purpose built as a bomb vessel for the Royal Navy instead of being converted from a captured vessel. However, the work was similarly extensive, with structures removed, the hull doubled and additional internal timber installed. The work was done remarkably quickly, perhaps by using large numbers of workers, and completed in only two days. According to the maritime historian Peter Goodwin, the work done on both ships made them "in effect Britain's first purpose-built icebreakers."

=== Crew members of the expedition ===
A total of 92 people sailed with Racehorse, 89 of them officers and men of the Navy. Members of the expedition included Henry Harvey as first lieutenant, Charles Irving as surgeon, Israel Lyons as astronomer, the Jersey-born Philippe d'Auvergne as midshipman, and Olaudah Equiano as able seaman. On Carcass, which carried 80 people on the voyage, midshipman Horatio Nelson, not even 15 years old, served as coxswain of the ship's boats. Two Greenland whalers each were hired as pilots for both of the ships. Future Continental Navy captain Nicholas Biddle also participated in the expedition, having resigned as a Royal Navy midshipman to do so. Biddle became acquainted with Nelson during the expedition.

=== Equipment ===
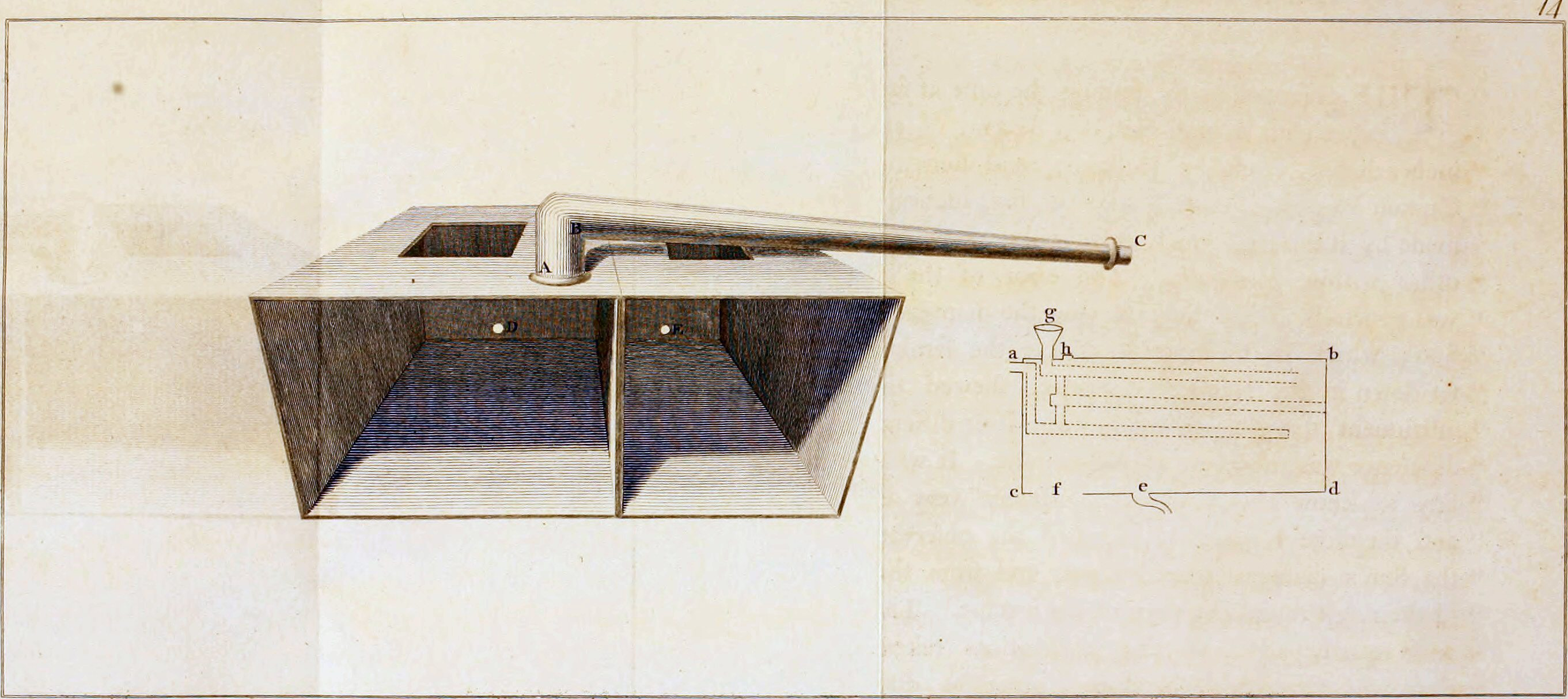
Charles Irving's apparatus for distilling seawater

The ships were equipped with extensive scientific equipment. For navigation, Racehorse was equipped with a Larcum Kendall K2 chronometer and Carcass with a John Arnold chronometer. Other new technology on board included Pierre Bouguer's improved log and Irving's apparatus for distillation of seawater. The ships carried boats large enough to transport the whole crew.

== Journey ==
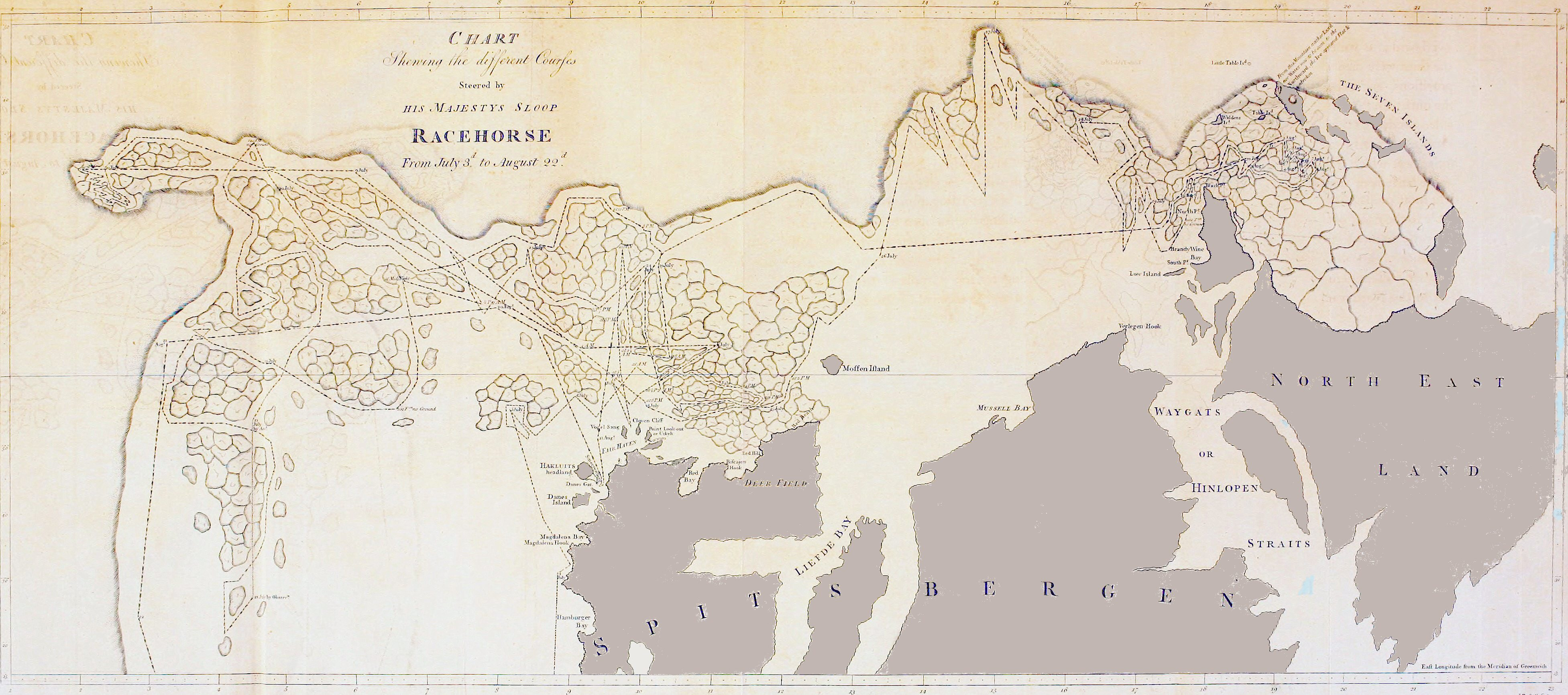
Chart of the courses of HMS Racehorse, from Phipps' 1774 book, land masses filled in for contrast

The Admiralty's instructions for Phipps from 25 May 1773 stated he should sail north from the Nore (a sandbank in the Thames Estuary) and then, "[...] passing between Spitzbergen and Greenland, proceed up to the North Pole or as far towards it as you are able, carefully avoiding the errors of former navigators by keeping as much as possible in the open sea, and as nearly upon a meridian to the said Pole as the ice or other obstructions you meet with will admit of. If you arrive at the Pole and should even find the sea so open as to admit of a free navigation on the opposite meridian you are not to proceed any further but [...] you are to return to the Nore [...]"

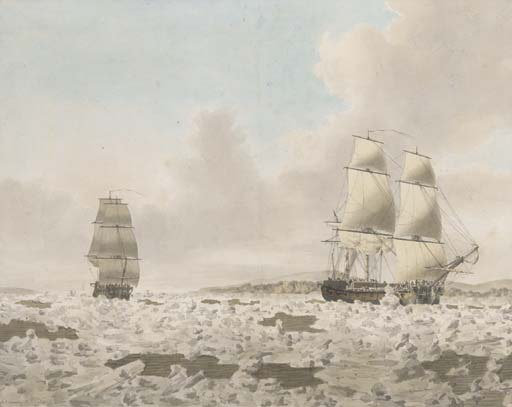
The Racehorse and Carcass forcing through the ice, watercolour by John Cleveley the Younger, 1774

The ships sailed north from the Nore on 4 June 1773. Spitsbergen was sighted on 28 June, and the ships sailed further north while observing and surveying the coast. From Hakluyt's headland at the northern end of Amsterdam Island, they continued northwest, starting to encounter ice. From 8 July, the ice made movement very difficult, and the ships had to be towed with smaller boats. As the ice to the north seemed impenetrable, Phipps turned east to determine whether the ice was joined with Spitsbergen. The expedition made further attempts to sail north while going east along the coast and surveying and studying various islands. On 27 July they reached their furthest point to the north at 80°48'N. On 30 July, on one of the Seven Islands, Phipps and Lutwidge climbed a hill and could see that the sea was completely frozen over to the east. On their return, the ships were completely surrounded by ice. Over the next few days, Phipps was ready to abandon ships and the crew started hauling the boats over the ice. However, on 10 August, the ships broke free of the ice and into the open sea and returned west to Fairhaven. After a final attempt to sail northwest on 19 August, they started the journey home. The ships were separated by storms, and on 18 September, Carcass reached Yarmouth Roads and Lutwidge sent news of the expedition to the Admiralty. The ships reunited on 26 September and returned to docks on the Thames on 30 September.

== Publications ==
The first book about the journey was an anonymous narrative that appeared in February 1774. (Note: An earlier report by an anonymous "Officer of the Squadron" was published in The Westminster Magazine, or, The Pantheon of Taste in October and November 1773.) According to Ann Savours, the most likely author was the surgeon on board the Carcass, William Wallis. Phipps' own book, A voyage towards the North Pole then appeared in the late summer of 1774. It contained 70 pages of narrative as well as a lengthy appendix with the scientific results of the journey. A description of the scientific instruments carried and their function forms a major part of the report. Phipps' book contained engravings depicting the ships in the ice based on watercolours by John Cleveley the Younger. These were in turn based on midshipman Philippe d'Auvergne's sketches. A French translation of the book appeared in 1775 and a German translation in 1777. The journey also features in Olaudah Equiano's 1789 autobiography, The Interesting Narrative of the Life of Olaudah Equiano, and another eyewitness account, that of midshipman Thomas Floyd, was compiled by his family and published in 1879.

== Legacy ==
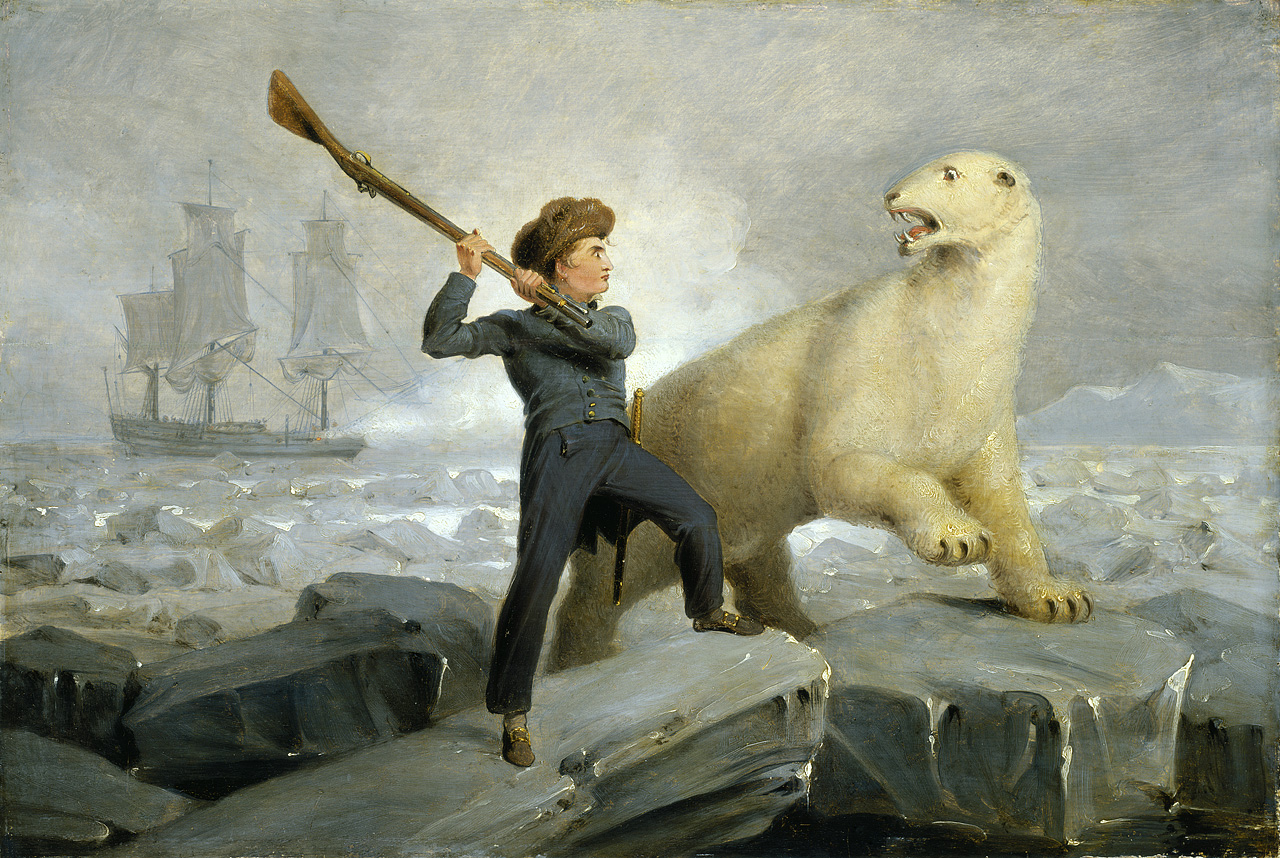
Nelson and the Bear (Richard Westall, 1809)

The failure of the expedition to get through the ice to the North Pole did not convince Barrington or Engel that this was impossible. Barrington's interest turned towards the Northwest Passage, and a British attempt at its discovery was soon made during the 1776–1780 third voyage of James Cook. Scientific results of Phipps' journey include the first scientific descriptions of the polar bear and the ivory gull. Some islands in Svalbard are named after expedition members: Nelsonøya, Phippsøya (the largest of the Seven Islands), and Waldenøya.

Starting in 1800, a story about Horatio Nelson chasing a polar bear began to circulate, including Nelson's alleged response to a reprimand from Lutwidge, "I wished, Sir, to get the skin for my father." After Nelson's death, the story was expanded in his biographies, and included claims that Nelson had tried to attack the bear with his broken musket, wielding it like a club, a scene immortalised in a painting by Richard Westall.

The Norwegian professor of British literature Peter Fjågesund described the Phipps expedition as "an Arctic expedition representing a watershed in polar exploration, adding to the discovery of land and natural resources a new dimension, namely that of scientific investigation".
