= Nelsonøya =

Island in Svalbard, Norway

Coordinates: 80°30′N 20°00′E

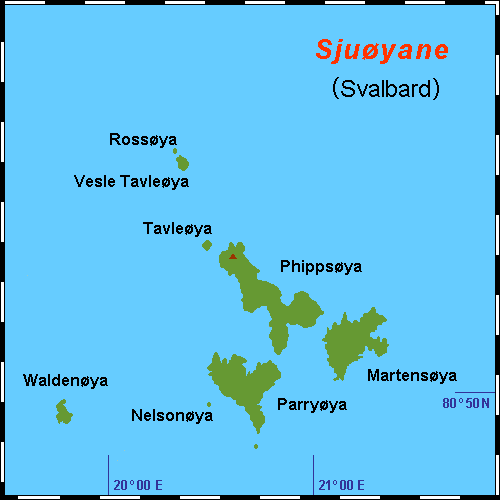
Sjuøyane

Nelsonøya (anglicized as Nelson Island) is a small island, part of Sjuøyane, north of Nordaustlandet.

The island is named after the well known englishman Horatio Nelson, who served as midshipman aboard HMS Carcass, under Captain Skeffington Lutwidge. The Carcass was one of the two bomb vessels sent under the command of Constantine John Phipps to Svalbard during the 1773 Phipps expedition towards the North Pole.
