= Polar Sea =

Polar Sea may refer to:

- The Arctic Ocean
- The Southern Ocean
- USCGC Polar Sea (WAGB-11), a United States Coast Guard icebreaker
- The Open Polar Sea, a hypothesized ice-free ocean surrounding the North Pole
