= Daines Barrington =

English lawyer, antiquary and naturalist

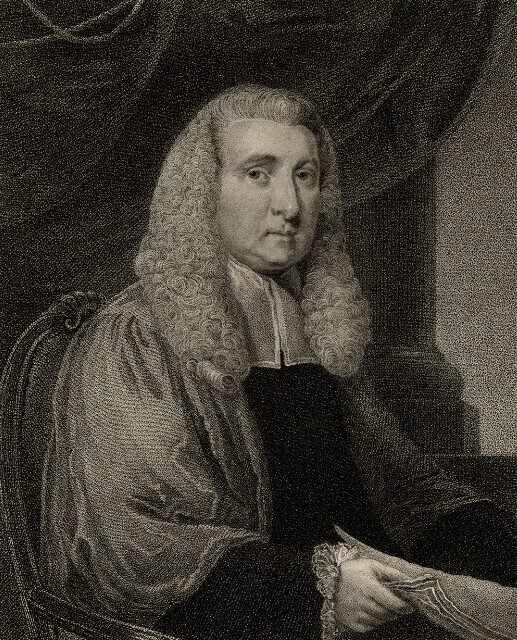
- Engraving based on a 1770 painting
- Born: 1727/28
- Died: 14 March 1800
- Education: The Queen's College, Oxford
- Occupation: Lawyer
- Known for: Correspondence with Gilbert White

Daines Barrington, FRS, FSA (1727/28 – 14 March 1800) was an English lawyer, antiquary and naturalist. He was one of the correspondents to whom Gilbert White wrote extensively on natural history topics. Barrington served as a Vice President of the Royal Society and wrote on a range of topics related to the natural sciences including early ideas and scientific experimentation on the learning of songs by young birds. He designed a standard format for the collection of information about weather, the flowering of plants, the singing of birds and other annual changes that was also used by Gilbert White. He was a proponent of the theory that the Arctic region is free of sea ice, and influenced several polar expeditions, including the 1773 Phipps expedition towards the North Pole. He also wrote on child geniuses including Mozart, who at the age of nine had visited England.

== Early life and legal career ==
Barrington was the third son of John Barrington, 1st Viscount Barrington. He matriculated at The Queen's College, Oxford, in 1745, but never graduated. In the same year he was admitted to the Inner Temple, and was called to the bar in 1750.

He subsequently held various legal offices, including marshal of the High Court of Admiralty, 1751–3; a judge of Great Sessions for North Wales (Anglesey, Caernarfonshire and Merionethshire) from 1757; Recorder of Bristol and King's Counsel from 1764; and second justice of Chester from 1778. Though considered by some (including Jeremy Bentham) to be an indifferent judge, his Observations on the Statutes, chiefly the more ancient, from Magna Charta to 21st James I (1766), had a high reputation among historians and constitutional antiquaries, and ran through five editions down to 1796. He resigned all his legal offices in 1785, retaining only that of Commissary General of the stores at Gibraltar, which continued to provide him with a substantial income until his death.

== Antiquarian and scientific writings ==
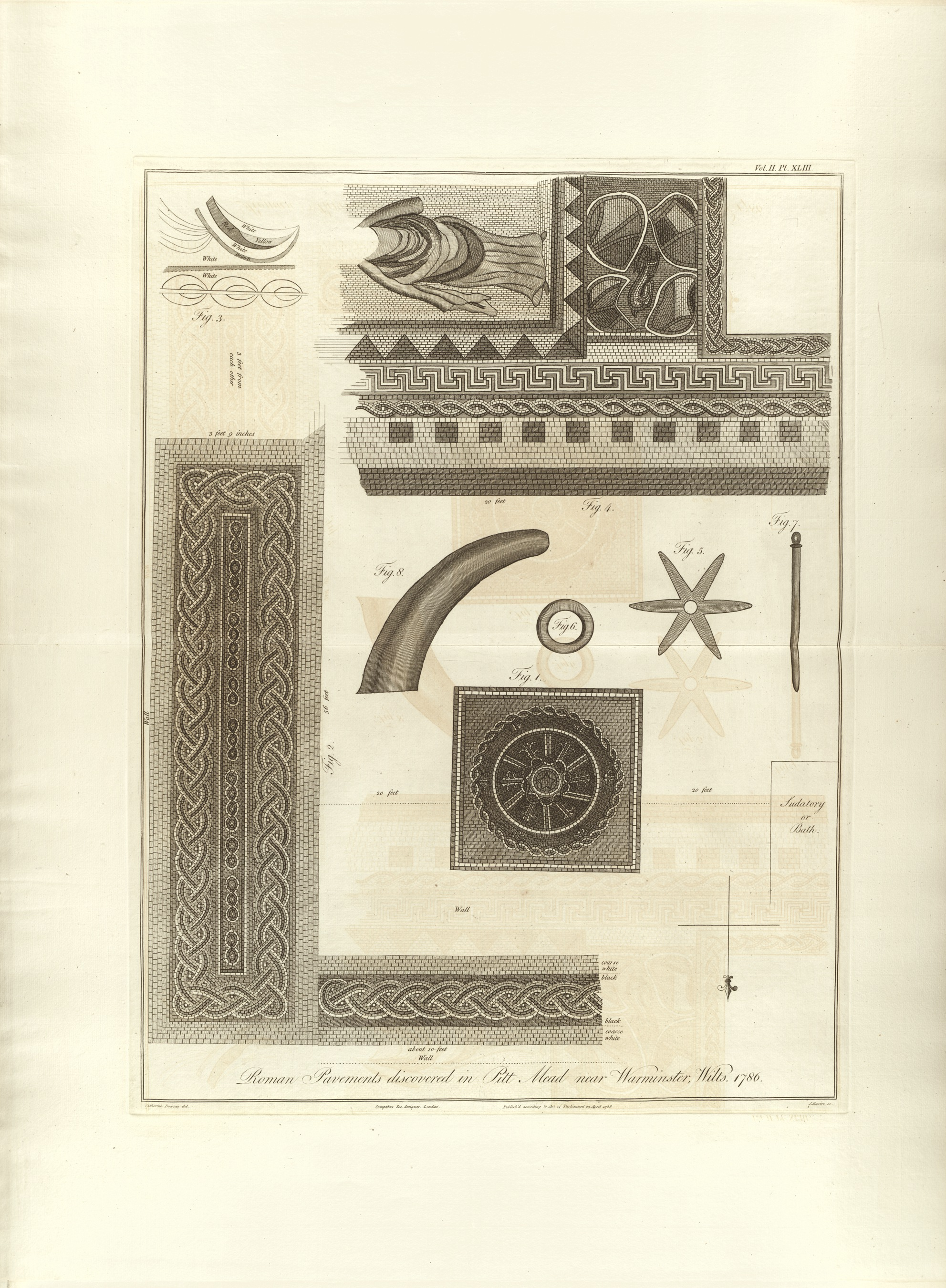
Pit Mead Roman villa mosaic, illustrations by Catherine Downes, engraved by James Basire and presented to the Society of Antiquaries of London by Barrington

In 1773, Barrington published an edition of Orosius, with the Anglo-Saxon version, and an English translation with original notes. Barrington's other writings are chiefly to be found in the publications of the Royal Society and the Society of Antiquaries: he was elected to both bodies in 1767, and afterwards became a vice-president of the latter. Many of these papers were collected by him in a quarto volume entitled Miscellanies on various Subjects (1781).

His Account of a very remarkable young Musician describes the 1764 London visit of the eight-year-old Mozart and first appeared in Philosophical Transactions of the Royal Society in 1770, later to be gathered in his Miscellanies with accounts of other prodigies, namely, William Crotch, Charles and Samuel Wesley, and Garret Wesley, 1st Earl of Mornington.

Finding that he was in humour, and as it were inspired, I then desired him to compose a Song of Rage, such as might be proper for the opera stage.

The boy again looked back with much archness, and began five or six lines of a jargon recitative proper to precede a Song of Anger. This lasted also about the same time with the Song of Love; and in the middle of it, he had worked himself up to such a pitch, that he beat his harpsichord like a person possessed, rising sometimes in his chair. …I must add [the fact that] I have been informed by two or three able musicians, when Bach the celebrated composer (Note: Presumably 'the London Bach' Johann Christian, (1735 – 1782)) had begun a fugue and left off abruptly, that little Mozart hath taken it up, and worked it after a most masterly manner.

Witness as I was myself of most of these extraordinary facts, I must own that I could not help suspecting his father imposed with regard to the age of the boy, though he had not only a most childish appearance, but likewise had all the actions of that stage of life. For example, whilst he was playing to me, a favorite cat came in, upon which he immediately left his harpsichord, nor could we bring him back for a considerable time.

Other studies include Experiments and Observations on the Singing of Birds and an essay on the language of birds. Barrington attempted cross-fostering experiments on birds and noted that young linnets raised with foster parents could be induced to learn the songs of various lark species. He however dismissed the idea of long-distance migration in birds, and supported the ancient view that swallows went to sleep underwater during winter.

Letters to Barrington from the parson-naturalist Gilbert White form a large part of White's 1789 book The Natural History and Antiquities of Selborne; Barrington's half of the correspondence is not included. Barrington established the format of the Naturalist's Journal for "keeping a daily register of observations on the weather, plants, birds, insects, &c" based on Benjamin Stillingfleet for collating information from across England. This format printed by Gilbert White's brother Benjamin was used from around 1769 to serve the study of the natural history of Selbourne. Very few of his log books are extant but Barrington has been considered as a pioneer of the study of phenology.

Barrington met the Cornish speaker Dolly Pentreath and published a report of the encounter. This report is the main source for the claim that Dolly was the last speaker of the Cornish language. A year after Dolly Pentreath died in 1777, Barrington received a letter, written in Cornish and accompanied by an English translation, from a fisherman in Mousehole named William Bodinar stating that he knew of five people who could speak Cornish in that village alone. Barrington also speaks of a John Nancarrow from Marazion who was a native speaker and survived into the 1790s.

The plant genus Barringtonia is named in his honour.

== Theories of the North Pole ==
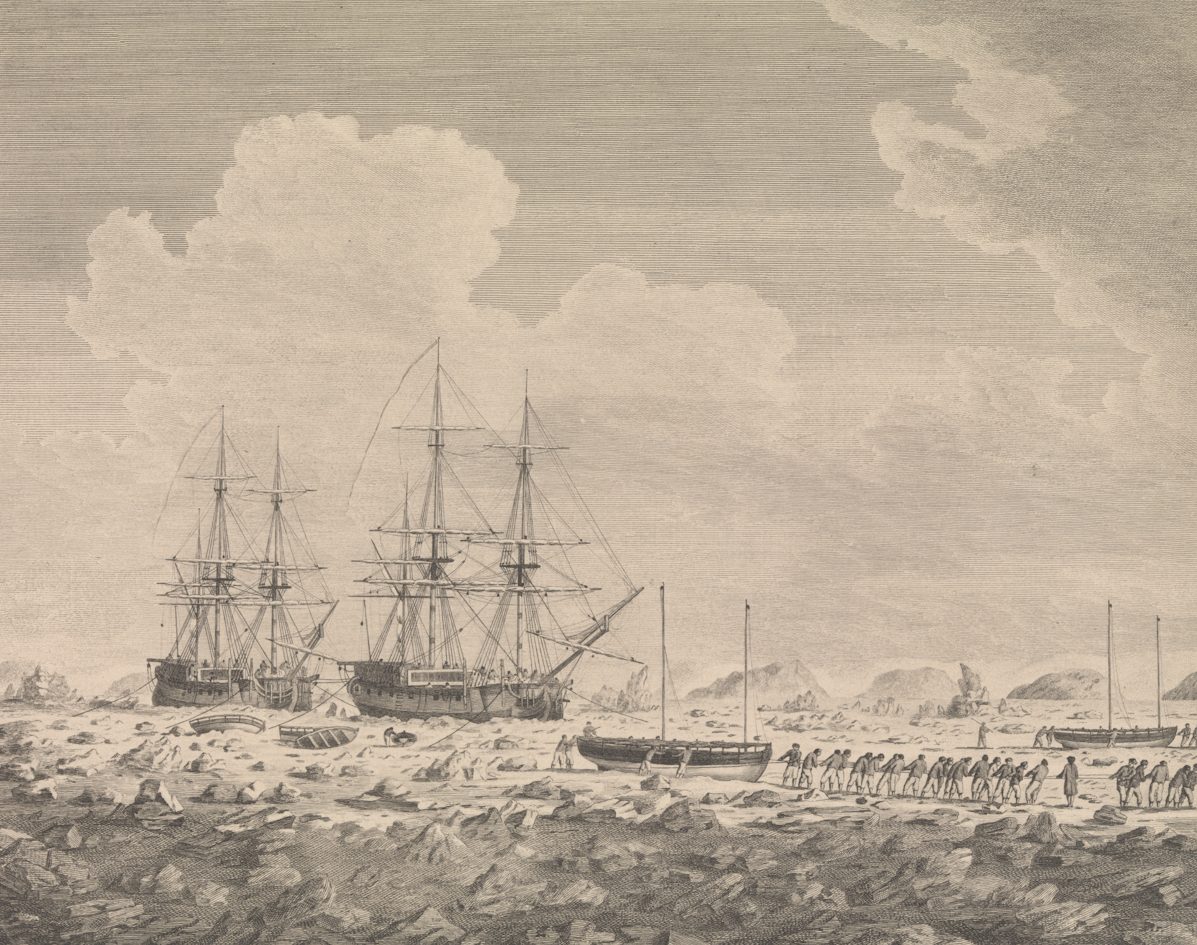
HMS Racehorse and HMS Carcass stuck in the ice on 7 August 1773 on the Phipps expedition

At a time when England continued to seek a Northwest Passage across North America, Barrington was intensely interested in the topic of navigation across the northern polar regions, and wrote a number of tracts on the subject. He maintained mistakenly that seawater cannot freeze, and that ice in northern regions was the result of frigid freshwater from rivers emptying into the ocean. By this theory, the polar regions should be free of ice, that previous attempts to find the Northwest Passage had failed because captains had followed routes too close to land, and therefore it would be possible to navigate to the Far East by crossing the North Pole. He lobbied for an expedition to test this theory, which was undertaken by Captain Constantine John Phipps in the summer of 1773. The Phipps expedition disproved his theory when both ships became stuck in sea ice near Norway's Svalbard Islands and with difficulty survived to return to England. The lack of success of finding an ice-free route did not dissuade Barrington from his theory, asserting that the ice had been a "temporary assemblage", and continued to promote the idea, writing a tract in 1775 entitled The Possibility of Approaching the North Pole Asserted. Barrington's theories of the Northwest Passage influenced the route of the third voyage of James Cook in 1776, in that an attempt was made to find the passage from the western side of North America (present day Alaska), which Barrington believed would be fruitful.

== Death and burial ==
Barrington never married, and lived for most of his life in chambers in King's Bench Walk in the Inner Temple, London. He was afflicted by paralysis from his legs upward and died after being bedridden for a long time on 14 March 1800; his remains were interred in the vault of the Temple Church.

== Notable works ==
- Orosius (1773) [c. 417]. Alfred the Great; Barrington, Daines (eds.). The Anglo-Saxon Version, from the Historian Orosius. London: Printed by W. Bowyer and J. Nichols and sold by S. Baker.
- Barrington, Daines (1818) [1775]. The Possibility of Approaching the North Pole Asserted. New York: James Eastburn & Co.

== Notes ==
Court offices
Preceded by William Robinson	Deputy Master of the Great Wardrobe; 1754–1756	Succeeded by Sir William Robinson, Bt
