= Evaporator (marine) =

Fresh water production device

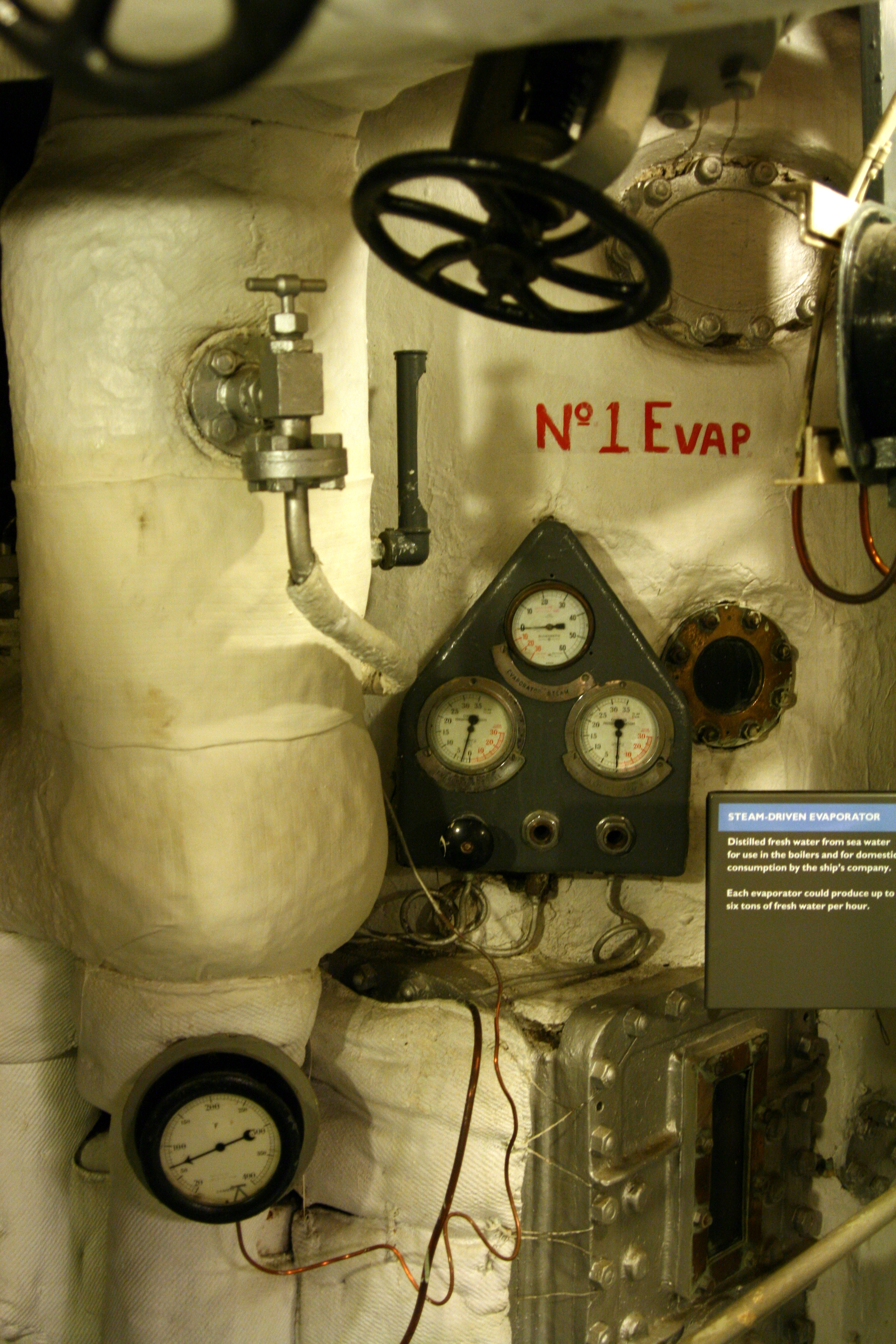
This steam evaporator aboard HMS Belfast distilled up to six tons of fresh water per hour for the boiler and for drinking.

An evaporator, distiller or distilling apparatus is a piece of ship's equipment used to produce fresh drinking water from sea water by distillation. As fresh water is bulky, may spoil in storage, and is an essential supply for any long voyage, the ability to produce more fresh water in mid-ocean is important for any ship.

== Early evaporators on sailing vessels ==
Basic schema of a still.

Although distillers are often associated with steam ships, their use pre-dates this. Obtaining fresh water from seawater is a theoretically simple system that, in practice, presented many difficulties. While there are numerous effective methods today, early desalination efforts had low yields and often could not produce potable water.

At first, only larger warships and some exploratory ships were fitted with distilling apparatus: a warship's large crew naturally needed a large supply of water, more than they could stow on board in advance. Cargo ships, with their smaller crews, merely carried their supplies with them. A selection of documented systems is as follows:

- 1539. Blasco de Garay.
- 1560. "Jornada de Los Gelves".
- 1578. Martin Frobisher. According to some authors, obtained fresh water from frozen seawater.
- 1717. A doctor from Nantes, M. Gauthier, proposed a still (not working well on the sea, with the rocking of the ship).
- 1763. Poissonier. Implemented a countercurrent water condenser.
- 1771. Method of Dr. Charles Irving, adopted by the British Royal Navy.
- 1771. Cook's Pacific exploration ship HMS Resolution carried a distiller and did tests to check: coal consumption vs. amount of fresh water produced.
- 1780. The patent and multi-functional Brodie stove was introduced to the Royal Navy. An example is on display on HMS Victory. This included a condenser above the boiling vessels, although this was incidental to their function for cooking.
- 1783. Louis Antoine de Bougainville.
- 1805. Nelson's HMS Victory was fitted with distilling apparatus in her galley.
- 1810. The improved Lamb & Nicholson patent stove superseded the Brodie. This was larger and was deliberately designed as much as a distiller as a cooking range.
- 1817. Louis Claude de Saulces de Freycinet.
- 1821. Publication of the details of an apparatus for distilling aiguardente in continuous process, by the Catalan Joan Jordana i Elias. This still had many advantages over the previous ones and was quickly adopted in Catalonia.

== Boiler feedwater ==
With the development of the marine steam engine, their boilers also required a continual supply of feedwater.

Early boilers used seawater directly, but this gave problems with the build-up of brine and scale. For efficiency, as well as conserving feedwater, marine engines have usually been condensing engines. By 1865, the use of an improved surface condenser permitted the use of fresh water feed, as the additional feedwater now required was only the small amount required to make up for losses, rather than the total passed through the boiler. Despite this, fresh water makeup to the feedwater system of a large warship under full power could still require up to 100 tons per day. Attention was also paid to de-aereating feedwater, to further reduce boiler corrosion.

The distillation system for boiler feedwater at this time was usually termed an evaporator, partly to distinguish it from a separate system or distiller used for drinking water. Separate systems were often used, especially in early systems, owing to the problem of contamination from oily lubricants in the feedwater system and because of the greatly different capacities required in larger ships. In time, the two functions became combined and the two terms were applied to the separate components of the system.

== Potable water distillers ==
The first water supply by distillation of boiler steam appeared on early paddle steamers and used a simple iron box in the paddle boxes, cooled by water splash. A steam supply direct from the boiler, avoiding the engine and its lubricants, was led to them. With the development of steam heating jackets around the cylinders of engines such as the trunk engine, the exhaust from this source, again unlubricated, could be condensed.

== Evaporators ==
=== Combined supply ===
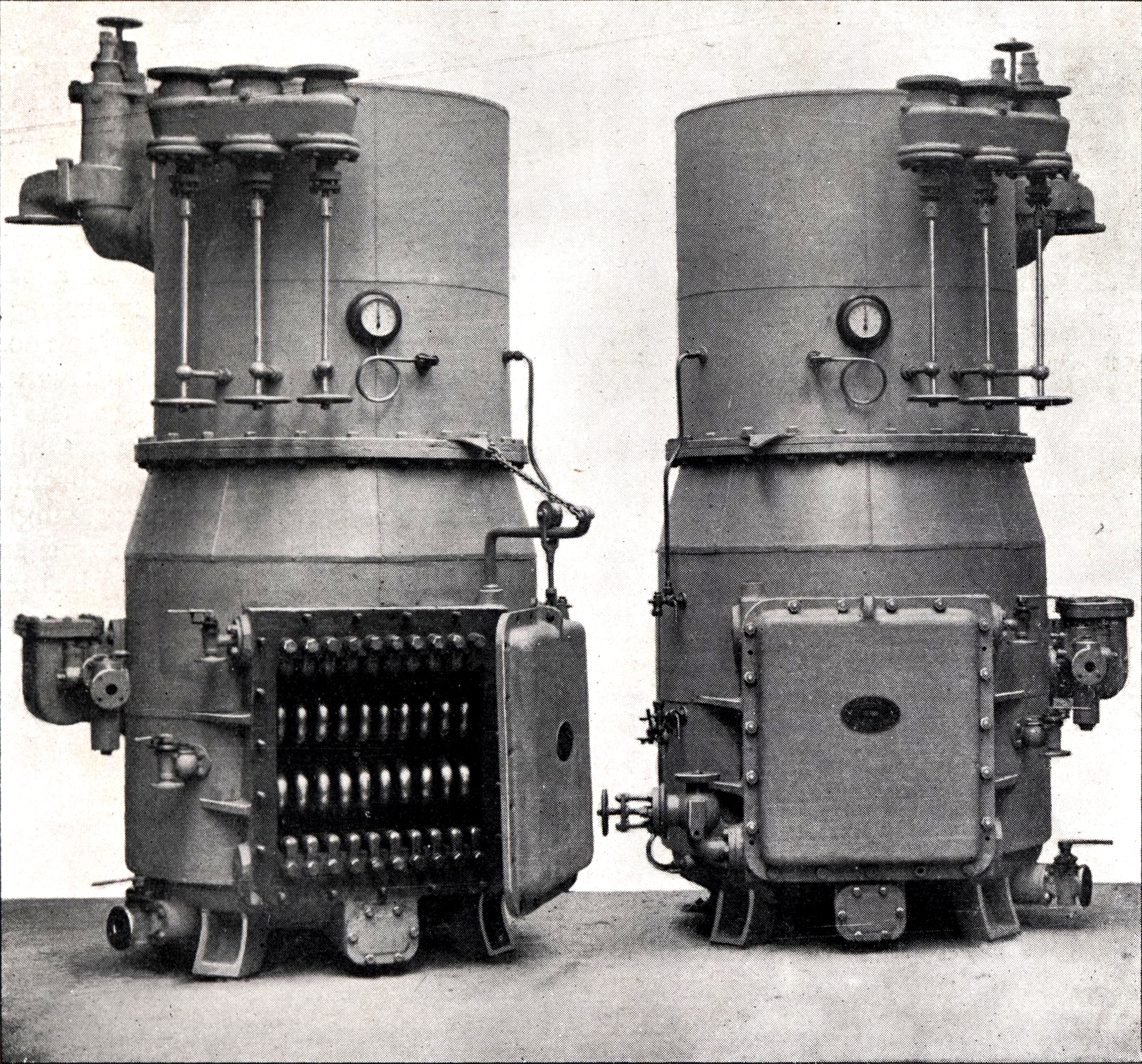
Two evaporators for the Olympic liners, 1910

The first distilling plants that boiled a separate water supply from that of the main boiler, appeared around 1867. These were not directly heated by a flame, but had a primary steam circuit using main boiler steam through coils within a steam drum or evaporator. The distillate from this vessel then passed to an adjacent vessel, the distilling condenser. As these evaporators used a 'clean' seawater supply directly, rather than contaminated water from the boiler circuit, they could be used to supply both feedwater and drinking water. These double distillers appeared around 1884. For security against failure, ships except the smallest were fitted with two sets.

=== Vacuum evaporators ===
Evaporators consume a great deal of steam, and thus fuel, in relation to the quantity of fresh water produced. Their efficiency is improved by working them at a partial vacuum, supplied by the main engine condensers. On modern diesel-powered ships, this vacuum can instead be produced by an ejector, usually worked by the output from the brine pump. Working under vacuum also reduces the temperature required to boil seawater and thus permits evaporators to be used with lower-temperature waste heat from the diesel cooling system.

=== Scale ===
One of the greatest operational problems with an evaporator is the build-up of scale. Its design is tailored to reduce this, and to make its cleaning as effective as possible. The usual design, as developed by Weir and the Admiralty, is for a vertical cylindrical drum, heated by steam-carrying drowned coils in the lower portion. As they are entirely submerged, they avoid the most active region for the deposition of scale, around the waterline. Each coil consists of one or two spirals in a flat plane. Each coil is easily removed for cleaning, being fastened by individual pipe unions through the side of the evaporator. A large door is also provided, allowing the coils to be removed or replaced. Cleaning may be carried out mechanically, with a manual scaling hammer. This also has a risk of mechanical damage to the tubes, as the slightest pitting tends to act as a nucleus for scale or corrosion. It is also common practice to break light scaling free by thermal shock, by passing steam through the coils without cooling water present or by heating the coils, then introducing cold seawater. In 1957, the trials ship HMS Cumberland, an obsolete heavy cruiser, was used for the first tests of the 'flexing element' distiller, where non-rigid heating coils flexed continually in service and so broke the scale free as soon as it formed a stiff layer.

Despite the obvious salinity of seawater, salt is not a problem for deposition until it reaches the saturation concentration. As this is around seven times that of seawater and evaporators are only operated to a concentration of two and a half times, this is not a problem in service.

A greater problem for scaling is the deposition of calcium sulphate. The saturation point for this compound decreases with temperature above 60 °C (140 °F), so that beginning from around 90 °C (194 °F) a hard and tenacious deposit is formed.

To further control scale formation, equipment may be provided to automatically inject a weak citric acid solution into the seawater feed. The ratio is 1:1350, by weight of seawater.

=== Compound evaporators ===
Operation of an evaporator represents a costly consumption of main boiler steam, thus fuel. Evaporators for a warship must also be adequate to supply the boilers at continuous full power when required, even though this is rarely required. Varying the vacuum under which the evaporator works, and thus the boiling point of the feedwater, may optimise production for either maximum output, or better efficiency, depending on which is needed at the time. Greatest output is achieved when the evaporator operates at near atmospheric pressure and a high temperature (for saturated steam this will be at a limit of 100 °C), which may then have an efficiency of 0.87 kg of feedwater produced for each kg of steam supplied.

If condenser vacuum is increased to its maximum, evaporator temperature may be reduced to around 72 °C. Efficiency increases until the mass of feedwater produced almost equals that of the supplied steam, although production is now restricted to 86% of the previous maximum.

Evaporators are generally installed as a set, where two evaporators are coupled to a single distiller. For reliability, large ships will then have a pair of these sets. It is possible to arrange these sets of evaporators in either parallel or in series, for either maximum or most efficient production. This arranges the two evaporators so that the first operates at atmospheric pressure and high temperature (the maximum output case), but then uses the resultant hot output from the first evaporator to drive a second, running at maximum vacuum and low temperature (the maximum efficiency case). The overall output of feedwater may exceed the weight of steam first supplied, as up to 160% of it. Capacity is however reduced, to 72% of the maximum.

=== Evaporator pumps ===
The unevaporated seawater in an evaporator gradually becomes a concentrated brine and, like the early steam boilers with seawater feed, this brine must be intermittently blown down every six to eight hours and dumped overboard. Early evaporators were simply mounted high-up and dumped their brine by gravity. As the increasing complexity of surface condensers demanded better feedwater quality, a pump became part of the evaporator equipment. This pump had three combined functions as a seawater feed pump, a fresh water delivery pump and a brine extraction pump, each of progressively smaller capacity. The brine salinity was an important factor in evaporator efficiency: too dense encouraged scale formation, but too little represented a waste of heated seawater. The optimum operating salinity was thus fixed at three times that of seawater, and so the brine pump had to remove at least one third of the total feedwater supply rate. These pumps resembled the steam-powered reciprocating feedwater pumps already in service. They were usually produced by the well-known makers, such as G & J Weir. Vertical and horizontal pumps were used, although horizontal pumps were favoured as they encouraged the de-aeration of feedwater. Electrically powered rotary centrifugal pumps were later adopted, as more efficient and more reliable. There were initial concerns whether these would be capable of pumping brine against the vacuum of the evaporator and so there was also a transitional type where a worm gear-driven plunger pump for brine was driven from the rotary shaft.

== Flash distillers ==
A later form of marine evaporator is the flash distiller. Heated seawater is pumped into a vacuum chamber, where it 'flashes' into pure water vapour. This is then condensed for further use.

As the use of vacuum reduces the vapour pressure, the seawater need only be raised to a temperature of 77 °C (171 °F). (Note: A temperature of at least 71 °C (160 °F) is required, for sterilisation purposes.) Both evaporator and distiller are combined into a single chamber, although most plants use two joined chambers, worked in series. The first chamber is worked at 23.5 inHg (80 kPa) vacuum, the second at 26–27 inHg (88–91 kPa). Seawater is supplied to the distiller by a pump at around 20 pounds per square inch (140 kPa). The cold seawater passes through a condenser coil in the upper part of each chamber before being heated by steam in an external feedwater heater. The heated seawater enters the lower part of the first chamber, then drains over a weir and passes to the second chamber, encouraged by the differential vacuum between them. The brine produced by a flash distiller is only slightly concentrated and is pumped overboard continuously.

Fresh water vapour rises through the chambers and is condensed by the seawater coils. Baffles and catchment trays capture this water in the upper part of the chamber. Vacuum itself is maintained by steam ejectors.

The advantage of the flash distiller over the compound evaporator is its greater operating efficiency, in terms of heat supplied. This is due to working under vacuum, thus low temperature, and also the regenerative use of the condenser coils to pre-heat the seawater feed.

A limitation of the flash distiller is its sensitivity to seawater inlet temperature, as this affects the efficiency of the condenser coils. In tropical waters, the distiller flowrate must be throttled to maintain effective condensation. As these systems are more modern, they are generally fitted with an electric salinometer and some degree of automatic control.

== Vapour-compression distillers ==
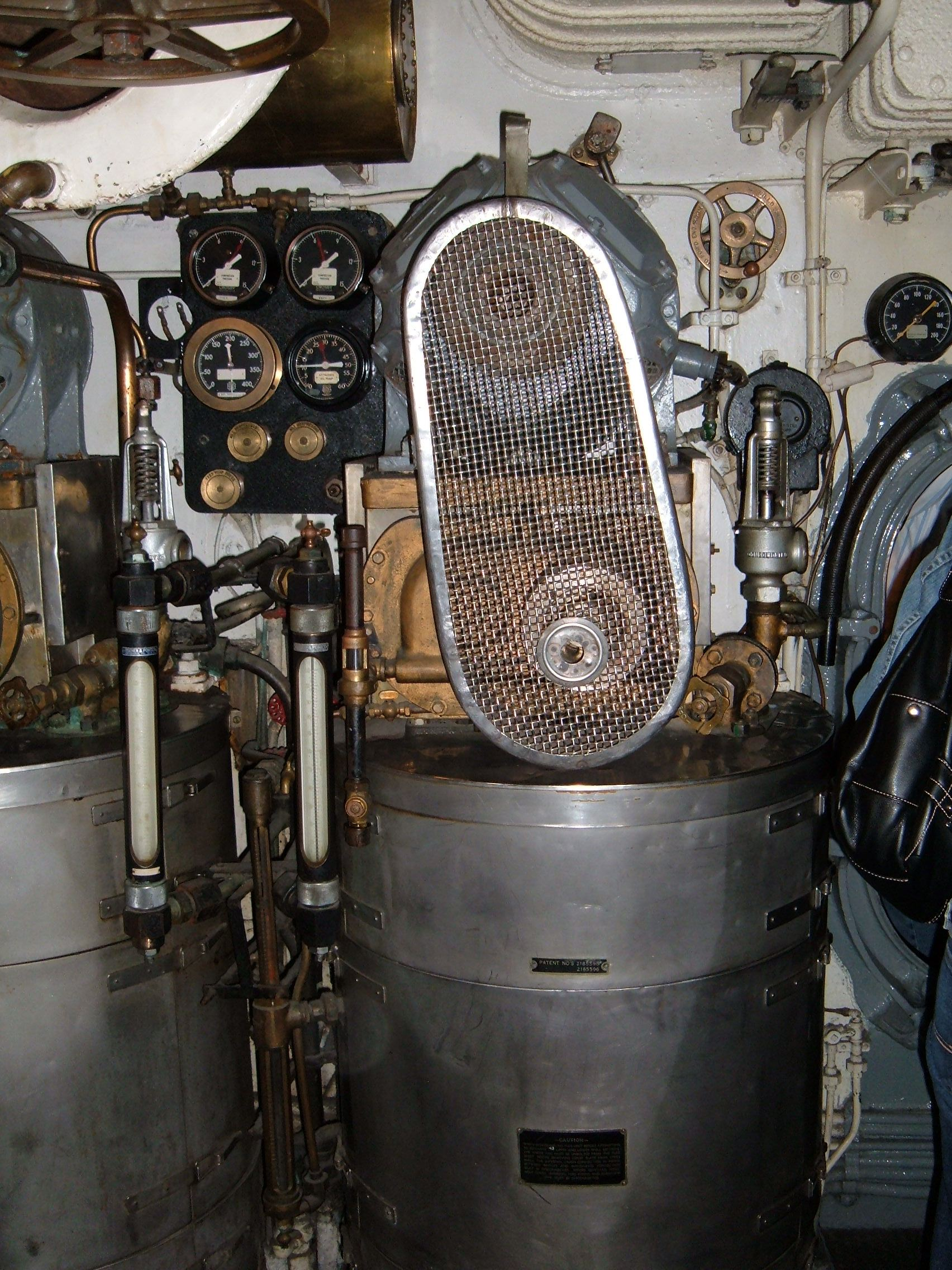
One of two vapour-compression distillers in the engine room of WW2 submarine USS Pampanito (SS-383)

Diesel-powered motorships do not use steam boilers as part of their main propulsion system and so may not have steam supplies available to drive evaporators. Some do, as they use auxiliary boilers for non-propulsion tasks such as this. Such boilers may even be heat-recovery boilers that are heated by the engine exhaust.

Where no adequate steam supply is available, a vapour-compression distiller is used instead. This is driven mechanically, either electrically or by its own diesel engine.

Seawater is pumped into an evaporator, where it is boiled by a heating coil. Vapour produced is then compressed, raising its temperature. This heated vapour is used to heat the evaporator coils. Condensate from the coil outlet provides the fresh water supply. To start the cycle, an electric pre-heater is used to heat the first water supply. The main energy input to the plant is in mechanically driving the compressor, not as heat energy.

Both the fresh water production and the waste brine from the evaporator are led through an output cooler. This acts as a heat exchanger with the inlet seawater, pre-heating it to improve efficiency. The plant may operate at either a low pressure or slight vacuum, according to design. As the evaporator works at pressure, not under vacuum, boiling may be violent. To avoid the risk of priming and a carry over of saltwater into the vapour, the evaporator is divided by a bubble cap separator.

=== Submarines ===
Vapour-compression distillers were installed on US submarines shortly before World War 2. Early attempts had been made with evaporators running from diesel engine exhaust heat, but these could only be used when the submarine was running at speed on the surface. A further difficulty with submarines was the need to produce high-quality water for topping up their large storage batteries. Typical consumption on a war patrol was around 500 US gal (2,000 L) per day for hotel services, drinking, cooking, washing (Note: Although German U-boats relied on saltwater soap, US practice was to fit adequate distilling plant.) etc. and also for replenishing the diesel engine cooling system. A further 500 US gal (2,000 L) per week was required for the batteries. The standard Badger model X-1 for diesel submarines could produce 1,000 US gal (4,000 L) per week. Tank capacity of 5,600 US gal (20,000 L) 1,200 US gal (5,000 L) of which was battery water) were provided, around 10 days reserve. With the appearance of nuclear submarines and their plentiful electricity supply, even larger plants could be installed. The X-1 plant was designed so that it could be operated when snorkelling, or even when completely submerged. As the ambient pressure increased when submerged, and thus the boiling point, additional heat was required in these submarine distillers, so they were designed to run with electric heat continuously.

== See also ==
- Chaplin's Patent Distilling Apparatus
- Scuttlebutt

== Bibliography ==
- Rippon, Commander P.M., RN (1988). The evolution of engineering in the Royal Navy. Vol. 1: 1827–1939. Spellmount. ISBN 0-946771-55-3.
- Rippon, Commander P.M., RN (1994). "5: Evaporator and Distilling Machinery". The evolution of engineering in the Royal Navy. Vol. 2: 1939–1992. Spellmount. pp. 40–44. ISBN 0907206476.
- Smith, E.C. (1937). "Introduction of Auxiliary Machinery". A Short History of Marine Engineering. Cambridge University Press, for Babcock & Wilcox. pp. 220–225.
- BR 77 Machinery Handbook. later replacement for the Stokers Manual. Admiralty, via HMSO. 1941.
- Naval Marine Engineering Practice. later replacement for the Stokers Manual. Vol. 1. Royal Navy, via HMSO. 1971 [1959]. ISBN 011-770223-4.
- Submarine Distilling Systems. The Fleet Type Submarine. Vol. 5. Bureau of Naval Personnel. January 1955. Navpers 16170. Archived from the original on 2012-03-18.
