= HMS Racehorse (1757) =

Sloop of the Royal Navy

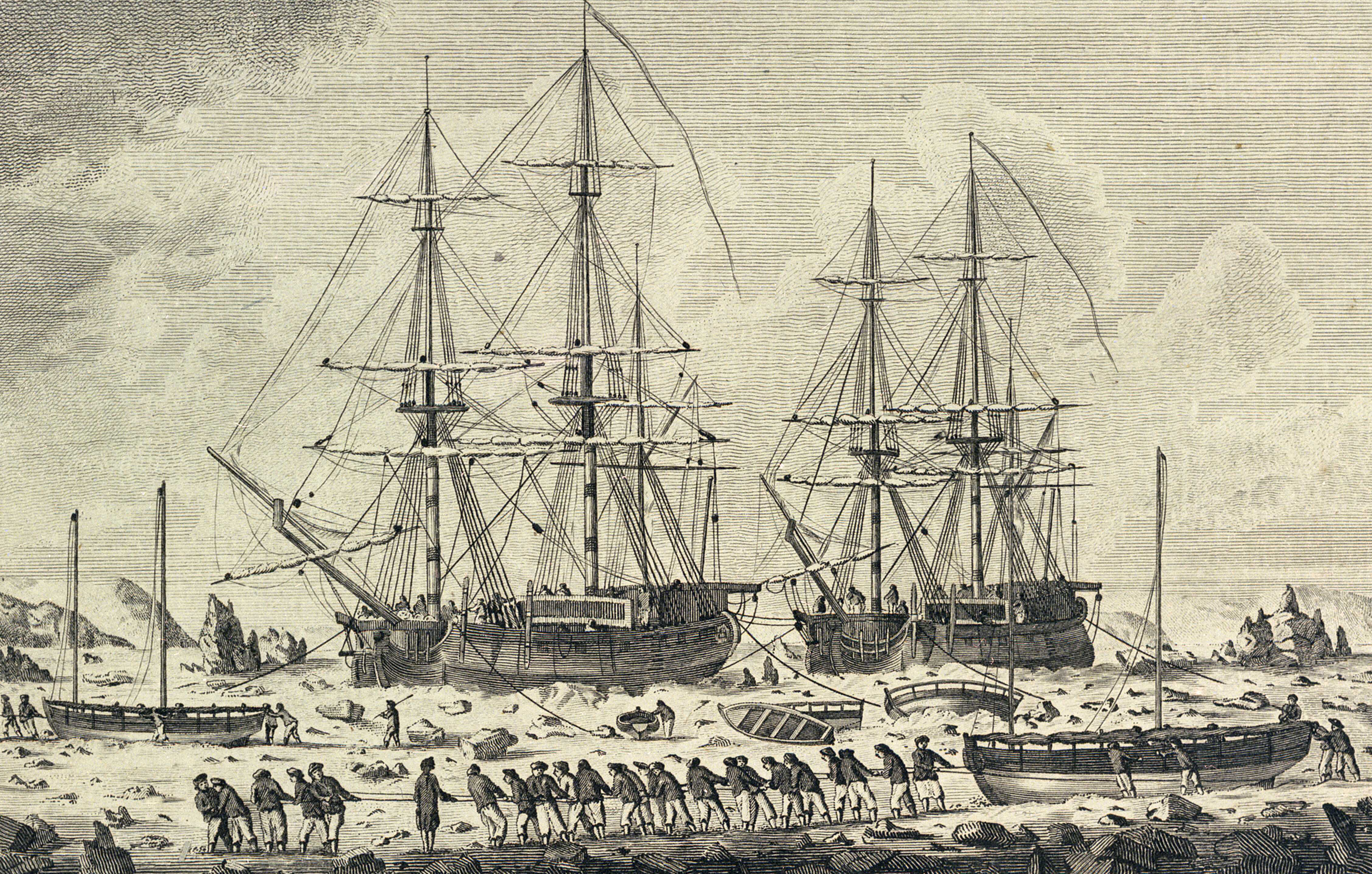
- Racehorse (left) stranded in the ice on 7 August 1773

History

Great Britain
- Name: HMS Racehorse
- Builder: Nantes
- Acquired: 28 April 1757
- Renamed: HMS Thunder (on 24 October 1775)
- Reclassified: Fireship between April and May 1758; Bomb vessel between 1758 and 1760; Discovery ship in 1773; Bomb vessel between 1775 and 1778
- Fate: Captured by the French on 14 August 1778

General characteristics as sloop
- Class & type: 18-gun sloop of war
- Tons burthen: 385 66/94 (bm)
- Length: 96 ft 7 in (29.44 m) (overall); 77 ft 1 1/4 in (23.501 m) (keel)
- Beam: 30 ft 8 in (9.35 m)
- Depth of hold: 13 ft 4 in (4.06 m)
- Propulsion: Sails
- Sail plan: Full-rigged ship
- Complement: 120
- Armament: 18 × 6-pounder guns + 14 × 1/2-pounder swivels

General characteristics as fireship
- Class & type: Fireship
- Complement: 45
- Armament: 8 × 6-pounder guns + 8 × 1/2-pounder swivels

General characteristics as bomb vessel
- Class & type: Bomb vessel
- Complement: 70
- Armament: 1 × 13 in mortar + 1 × 10 in mortar; 8 × 6-pounder guns + 12 × 1/2-pounder swivels

HMS Racehorse was an 18-gun ship-rigged (i.e. three-masted) sloop of the Royal Navy. Originally the French ship Marquis de Vaudreuil, she was captured by the Royal Navy in 1757 and refitted as a survey vessel for the 1773 Phipps expedition towards the North Pole. Renamed HMS Thunder in 1775, she was captured back by the French in 1778.

== Early Royal Navy service, 1757 to 1763 ==
Racehorse was originally the 18-gun French privateer Marquis de Vaudreuil, purchased from the French during the Seven Years' War for the British Navy on 28 April 1757. As she was a three-masted vessel, she was described as a "frigate", but as she mounted just 18 guns, she was actually registered as a sloop.

In this role, she served her first commission (from June 1757 to 1758) under Commander Francis Burslem in home waters. She was reclassed and refitted as a fireship (re-armed with just eight 6-pounders), and then as a bomb vessel (with the addition of one 13-inch and one 10-inch mortars) and was recommissioned under Commander Francis Richards for service in North American waters. By 1760 she was re-armed as a "frigate" again, with 16 guns, under Commander James Harmood and later under Commander John Macartney until paid off in 1763.

== 1773 North Pole expedition ==
After a refit at Sheerness, Racehorse was recommissioned in 1771 under Commander St John Chinnery, until paid off in early 1773. She was then refitted for Arctic exploration, and was part of a voyage of exploration in 1773, commanded by Commander Constantine John Phipps, that unsuccessfully attempted to sail to the North Pole. A young Horatio Nelson served as a midshipman aboard the second ship of the small squadron, HMS Carcass under captain Skeffington Lutwidge, second in command of the Phipps expedition.

The expedition left the Nore on 10 June and passed along the western coast of Svalbard and advanced to latitude 80°50'N before reaching impenetrable ice front. They came in sight of Sjuøyane off Svalbard's north coast and midshipman John Walden, along with two pilots, landed on the westernmost island on 5 August of the same year. The island was later known as Waldenøya, or Walden Island.

Other islands named after expedition members are Phippsøya and Nelsonøya of Sjuøyane. Additionally, Cummingøya is named after watchmaker Alexander Cumming, who made the pendulum used by Phipps' expedition. According to Gerard De Geer's 1913 Spitzbergen map, this is the island where Phipps tried to make a pendulum observation.

== Later Navy service as Thunder ==
Returning to Deptford from this voyage in October 1773, she was paid off until recommissioned in January 1775 under Commander James Orrok; she was again refitted as a bomb vessel and – now renamed Thunder and reclassed as bomb vessel on 24 October 1775 – passed under the command of Commander James Reid, sailing on 23 February 1776 for service in North America. Commander Anthony Molloy took over command from Reid in June 1776, and he was succeeded in April 1778 by Commander James Gambier.

The French 74-gun ships Hector and Vaillant, part of the squadron under the Comte d'Estaing, captured Thunder off Sandy Hook on 14 August 1778.
