= Open Polar Sea =

Hypothesized ice-free ocean surrounding the North Pole

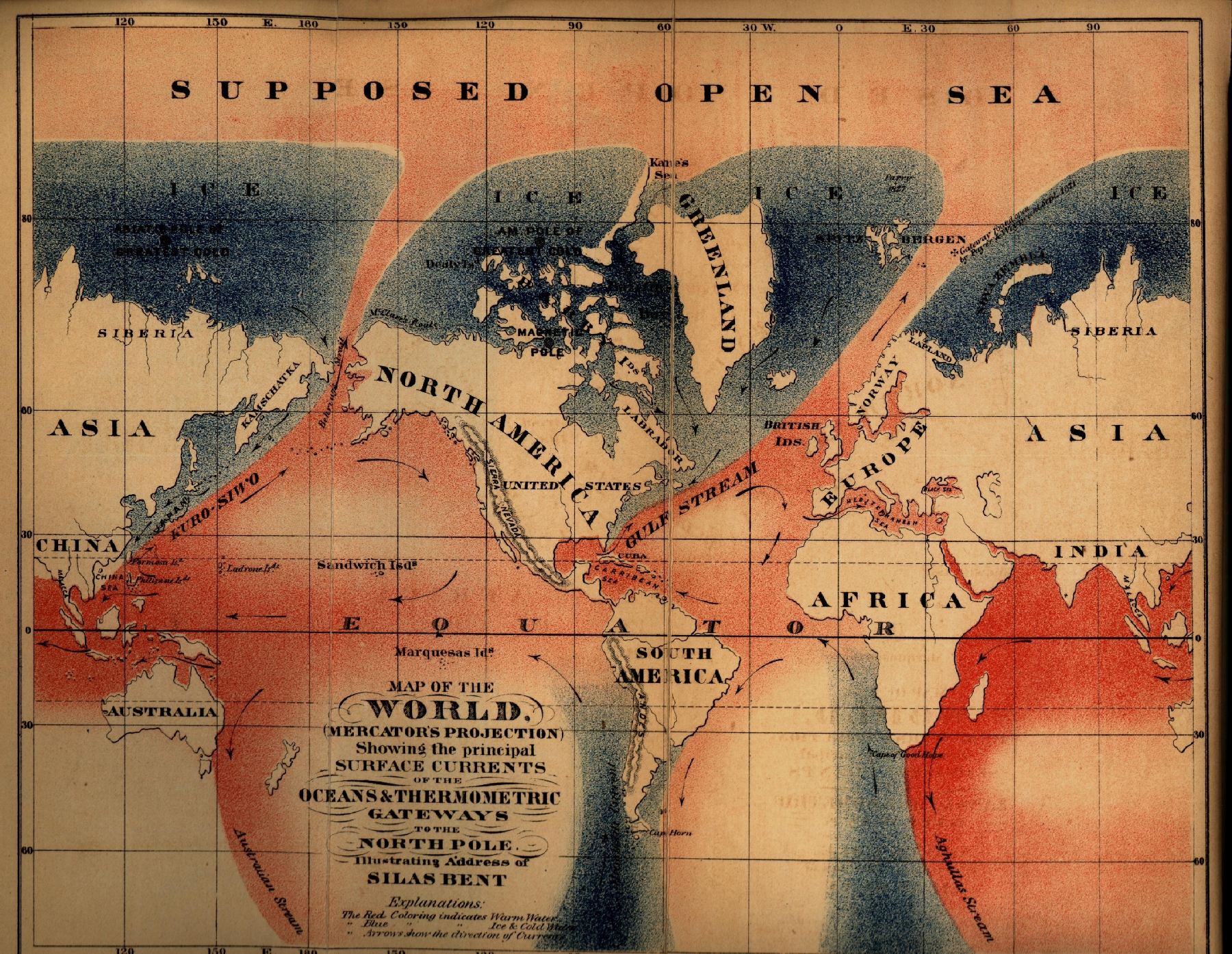
- Silas Bent's 1872 map including the "Supposed Open Sea"
- Created by: Suggested by Robert Thorne in the 16th century

In-universe information
- Type: Ice-free ocean in the North Pole area
- Locations: Arctic Ocean

The Open Polar Sea was a conjectured ice-free body of water that was believed to encircle the North Pole. Although this theory was widely accepted and served as a basis for many exploratory expeditions aimed at reaching the North Pole by sea or discovering a navigable route between Europe and the Pacific via the North Pole, it was ultimately proven to be untrue.

== History ==
The theory that the North Pole region might be a practical sea route goes back to at least the 16th century, when it was suggested by English cartographer Robert Thorne (1492-1532). The explorers William Barents and Henry Hudson also believed in the Open Polar Sea. For a time, the theory was put aside because of the practical experience of navigators who encountered impenetrable ice as they went north.

However, the idea was revived again in the mid-19th century by theoretical geographers, such as Matthew F. Maury and August Petermann. At the time, interest in polar exploration was high because of the search for John Franklin's missing expedition, and many would-be polar explorers took up the theory, including Elisha Kent Kane, Dr. Isaac Israel Hayes, and George Washington De Long.

It was believed that once a ship broke through the regions of thick ice that had stopped previous explorers, a temperate sea would be found beyond it.

== Support ==
Although it is now known that the North Pole was covered with thick ice for much of the period, the Open Polar Sea was a popular theory in the 16th to the 19th centuries, and many arguments were made to justify its existence:

- Since sea ice was erroneously believed to form only near land, if there were no land near the North Pole, there would be no ice.
- Since there is perpetual sun during the Arctic summer, it would melt all the ice.
- Russian explorers had found large polynyas (areas of open water) north of Svalbard and so there were surely other areas of open water elsewhere.
- Maury, Petermann, and other scientists who studied ocean currents in the 19th century hypothesized that warm northward currents such as the Gulf Stream and Kuroshio Current must rise to the surface and result in an ice-free sea near the pole.
- Extrapolation of temperature readings taken in subpolar regions indicated that the region of greatest cold would be at about 80°N, instead of at the North Pole.
- Migration patterns of certain animals seemed to suggest that the polar region was a hospitable place for them to live.

== Disproof and re-emergence ==
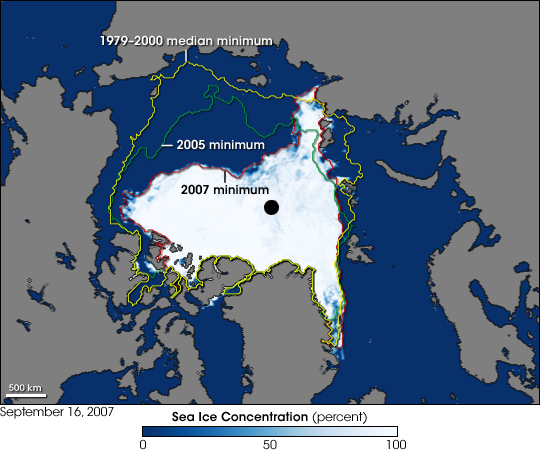
Arctic shrinkage as of 2007 compared to previous years

The Open Polar Sea was debunked gradually by the failure of the expeditions in the 1810s to the 1880s to navigate the polar sea. Reports of open water by earlier explorers, such as Elisha Kent Kane and Isaac Israel Hayes, fueled optimism in the theory in the 1850s and 1860s. Support faded when George W. De Long sailed USS Jeannette into the Bering Strait in the hope of finding an open gateway to the North Pole and was met by a sea of ice. After a long drift, pack ice crushed the Jeannette, and her survivors returned home with first hand accounts of an ice-covered polar sea. Other explorers such as British explorer George Nares confirmed it.

When Fridtjof Nansen and Otto Sverdrup drifted through the polar ice pack in Fram in 1893 to 1895, the Open Polar Sea was a defunct theory.

Nevertheless, scientific studies of global warming in the 2000s project that by the end of the 21st century, the annual summer withdrawal of the polar ice cap could expose large areas of the Arctic Ocean as open water, and an ice-free Arctic is possible in the future because of Arctic shrinkage. Although the North Pole itself could potentially remain ice-covered in winter, a navigable seasonal sea passage from Europe to the Pacific could develop along the north coast of Asia.

== See also ==
- Northwest Passage
- Superseded theories in science
