= Skeffington Lutwidge =

Royal Navy officer (1737–1814)

Admiral Skeffington Lutwidge
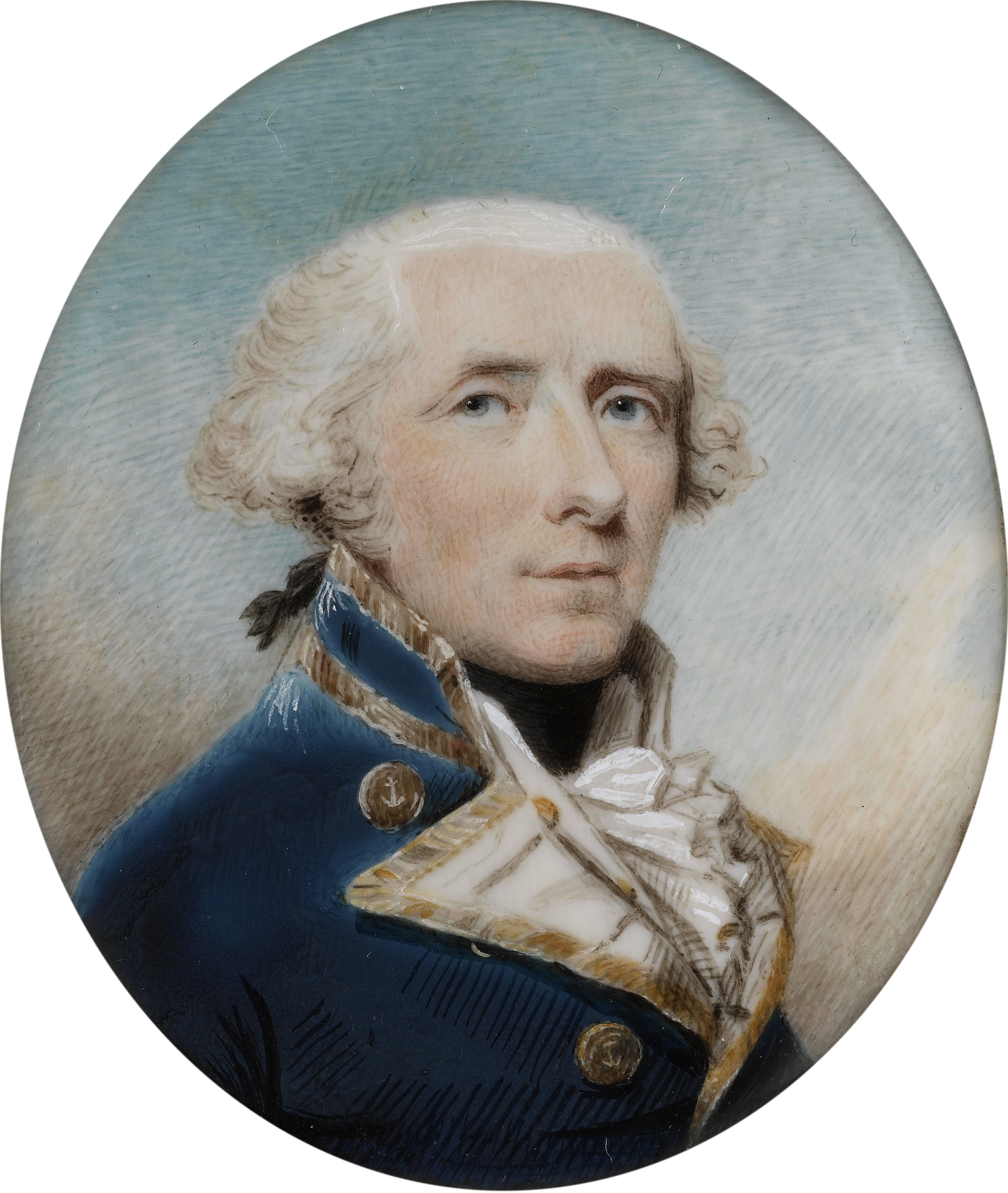
- Portrait by Philip Jean
- Born: 13 March 1737
- Died: 15/16 August 1814; Holmrook, Cumbria
- Military career
- Allegiance: Great Britain; United Kingdom
- Branch: Royal Navy
- Service years: –1814
- Rank: Admiral of the Red
- Commands: HMS Cholmondely; HMS Carcass; HMS Triton; HMS Yarmouth; HMS Perseverance; HMS Scipio; HMS Terrible; Nore Command; The Downs
- Conflicts: Siege of Fort Ticonderoga (1777); Battle of Cape St. Vincent (1780)

Admiral of the Red Skeffington Lutwidge (13 March 1737 – 15/16 August 1814) was a Royal Navy officer who served in the American War of Independence and French Revolutionary and Napoleonic Wars. He had a particular connection with Horatio Nelson, who served under Lutwidge as a midshipman on an expedition to the Arctic in HMS Carcass in 1773, and again in 1801 while a captain, when Lutwidge was commander in chief in the Downs.

Lutwidge served for a considerable period and in a number of ships, in American waters during the War of Independence. During this time he captured a number of American privateers, and was involved in operations on Lake Champlain. He reached flag rank soon after the start of the French Revolutionary Wars, and served mainly in Home waters as commander in chief of some of the stations on the south coast. He retired from active service with the rank of admiral, and died in 1814, shortly before the end of the Napoleonic Wars. He was the great-uncle of Lewis Carroll.

== Early life ==
Lutwidge was born on 13 March 1737, the son of Thomas Lutwidge of Whitehaven and his second wife Lucy nee Hoghton. Lutwidge embarked on a career in the Navy, and is listed as a lieutenant in 1763, taking command of the purchased cutter HMS Cholmondely in April that year. He remained with her until 1765, serving in the area of Liverpool.

== Arctic voyage ==
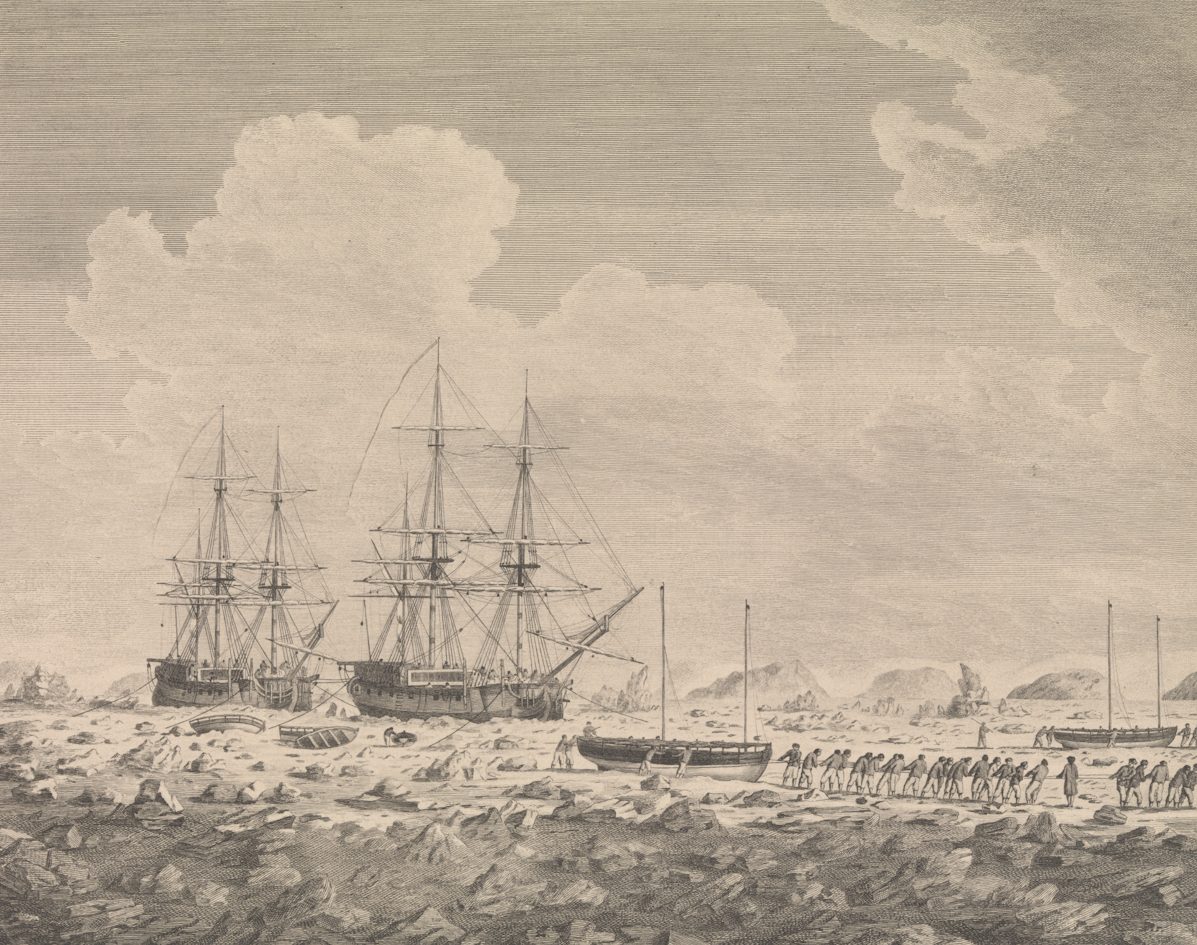
HMS Racehorse and HMS Carcass stuck in the ice on 7 August 1773

Lutwidge, by now a commander, commissioned the bomb vessel HMS Carcass in June 1771, and served in the Irish Sea until the Carcass was paid off in April 1773. The Carcass was then refitted at Sheerness between March and April for a voyage to the Arctic, with Lutwidge retaining command. The expedition, under the overall command of Constantine Phipps, who commanded HMS Racehorse, sailed from the Nore on 10 June 1773. The expedition sailed up to and around Spitsbergen, managing to reach within ten degrees of the North Pole, but was prevented from travelling further north by thick sea ice, and returned to Britain in September. Sailing with the Carcass was a young Horatio Nelson, whose position as a midshipman on the expedition had been arranged by his uncle, Maurice Suckling. Suckling and Lutwidge knew each other well, Lutwidge having served under Suckling on a number of occasions, including time spent acting against privateers in 1771. Nelson was given the role of coxswain of Lutwidge's gig. Nelson managed to obtain command of the Carcass's cutter as the expedition progressed.

=== Nelson and the bear ===
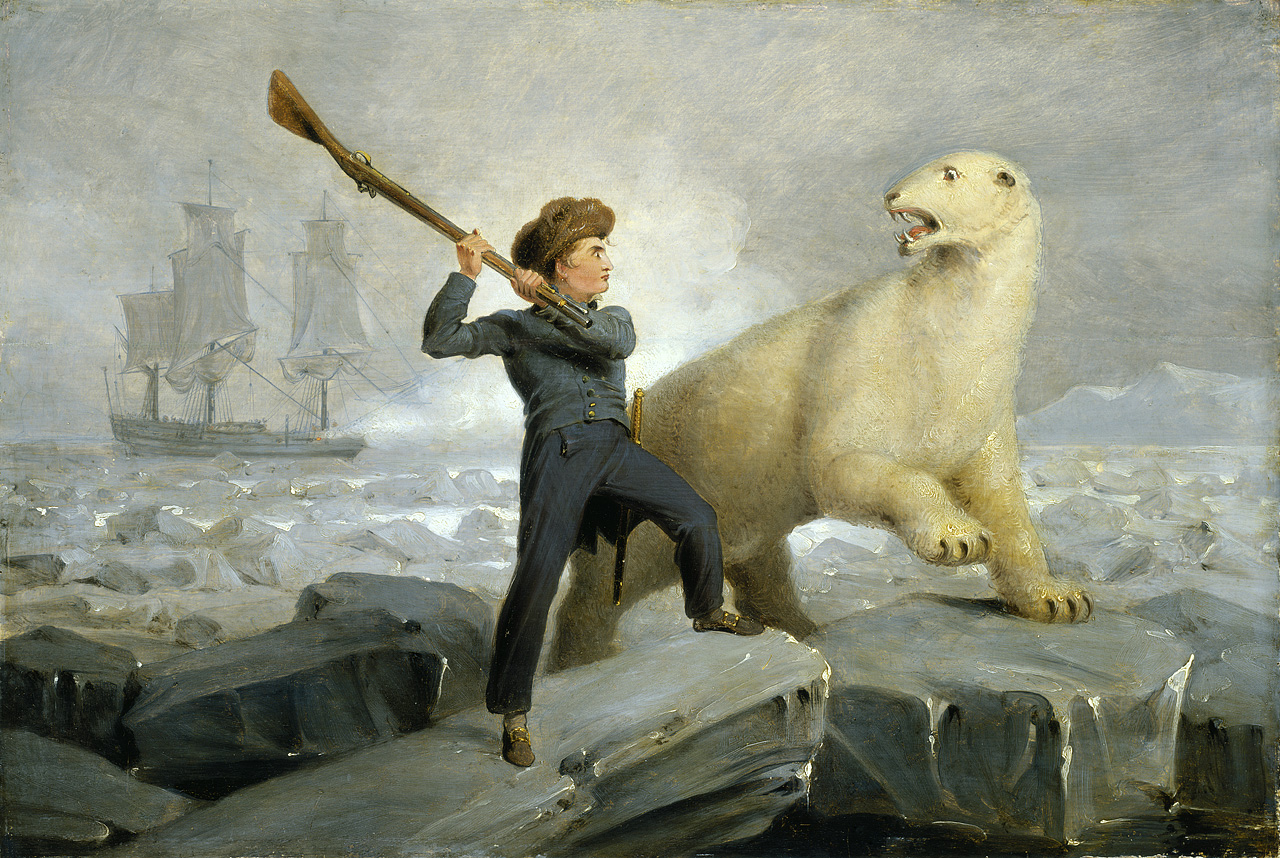
Nelson and the Bear (Richard Westall, 1809)

By 1800 Lutwidge began to circulate a story that while the ship had been trapped in the ice, Nelson had seen and pursued a polar bear, before being ordered to return to the ship. Lutwidge's later version, in 1809, reported that Nelson and a companion had given chase to the bear, but on being questioned why, replied that "I wished, Sir, to get the skin for my father." Nelson referred to Lutwidge as 'that good old man'.

== Later commands ==
Lutwidge was appointed to command the 28-gun sixth rate HMS Triton in August 1775, and sailed to North America in March the following year. He played an active role in the American War of Independence, serving in the Saint Lawrence River between 1777 and 1778. On 10 April 1777 he was made commodore and commander-in-chief of the British naval forces on Lake Champlain by Guy Carleton. He led the naval forces pursuing the Americans who were retreating from the fall of Fort Ticonderoga in July that year. Lutwidge was replaced in his role on 4 October 1777 by Captain Samuel Graves.

Returning to sea-going service he captured the American privateer Pompey on 13 June 1778. The Triton returned to Britain to be refitted and re-coppered in early 1779, after which she returned to North America, capturing the American privateer Gates on 29 September 1779. He was involved in the capture of a Spanish convoy on 8 January 1780, and on the night of 16 and 17 January Lutwidge was part of Admiral George Rodney's fleet against Juan de Lángara at the Battle of Cape St. Vincent. His final duties with the Triton were to escort a convoy to Menorca and then to the Leeward Islands. Lutwidge then briefly took command of the 74-gun third rate HMS Yarmouth and sailed her back to Britain with American prisoners of war, paying her off after her arrival in March.

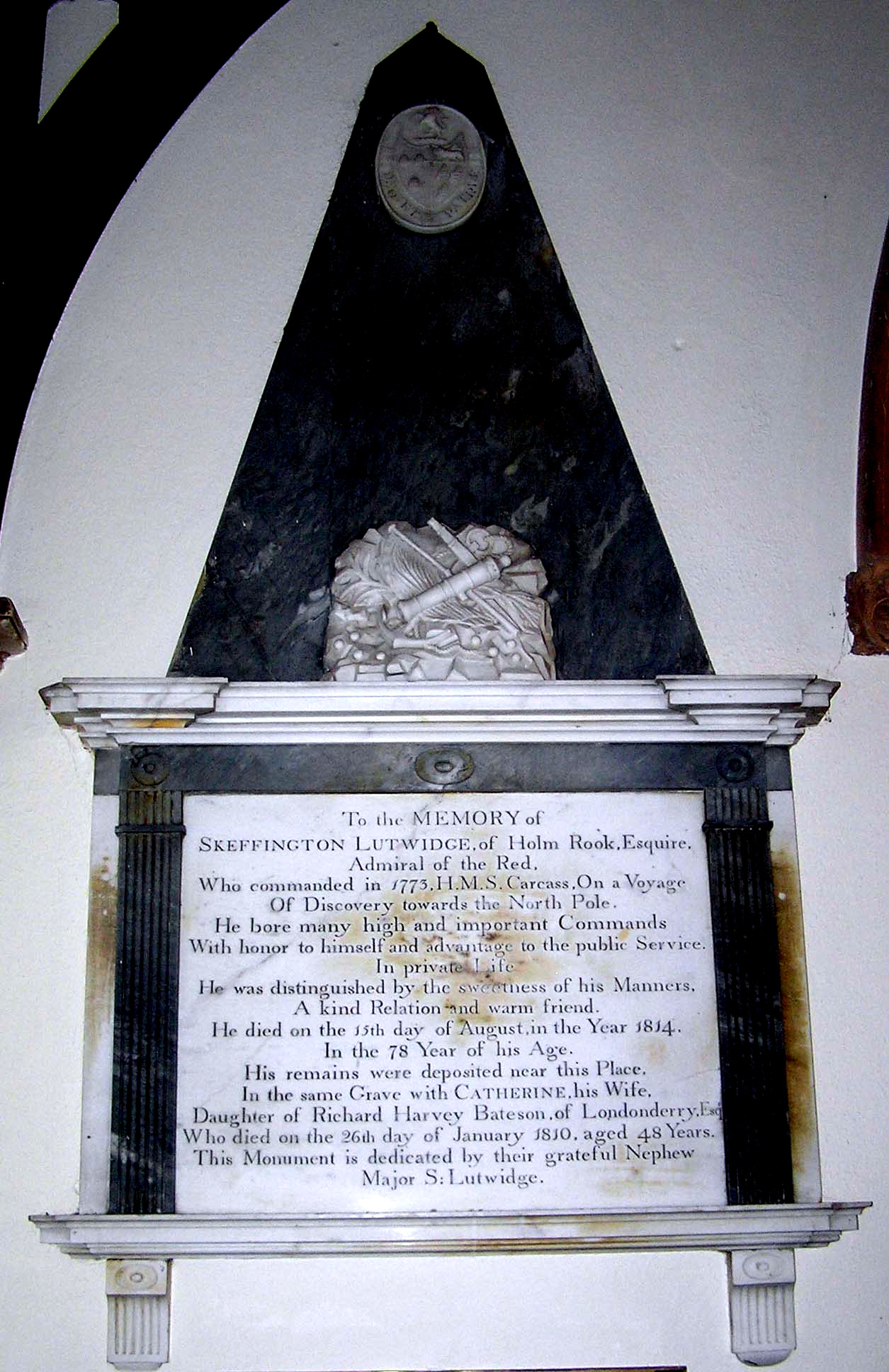
Memorial to Lutwidge in St Paul, Irton

He was almost immediately posted to the new fifth rate HMS Perseverance, and commissioned her in March. By September he was back on the North American station, re-capturing the 20-gun HMS Lively on 29 July during his voyage across the Atlantic. The next two years were spent on the North American station, capturing a number of American privateers during this time, the General Green on 30 August 1781, the Raven on 1 April 1782 and the Diana on 29 August 1782. The Perseverance was paid off after the conclusion of the war. Lutwidge is next recorded as taking command of the third rate HMS Scipio in November 1786, the Scipio then being a guard ship on the River Medway. In December 1792 he commissioned the new third rate HMS Terrible. Following the entry of Britain into the War of the First Coalition he sailed in April 1793 to join the Mediterranean Fleet to join Admiral Samuel Hood.

== Flag rank and later life ==
By 1797 he had been advanced to Vice-Admiral, and in July that year he hoisted his flag aboard the second rate HMS Sandwich, in his post as Commander-in-Chief, The Nore, before the Sandwich was paid off in September. Lutwidge moved his flag to the new guard ship, the third rate HMS Zealand in October, shifting again to HMS Overyssel in 1799. He became a Vice-Admiral of the Red on 14 February 1799, and in the same was made commander of the fleets in the Downs, where under his command in 1801 was his former midshipman of the Carcass Horatio Nelson, by now in command of HMS Medusa. Lutwidge was advanced to Admiral of the Blue on 1 January 1801, Admiral of the White on 9 November 1805, and Admiral of the Red on 31 July 1810. He retired from active service and died at his estates at Holmrook in Cumberland (now Cumbria) on 16 August 1814, at the age of 78.

A monument to his memory was raised in St Paul, Irton parish church, to the east of Holmrook, in the form of a stained glass window. He had married Catherine Harvey, but she predeceased him in 1810, and they had no children to succeed him. A distant relation was his great-nephew Charles Lutwidge Dodgson, better known as the author Lewis Carroll. Skeffington Lutwidge's nephew, Major Charles Lutwidge, who sold the Holmrook estate to him, was the father of Carroll's mother Fanny.

== Notes ==
Military offices
Preceded by Charles Buckner	Commander-in-Chief, The Nore; 1797–1798	Succeeded by Sir Thomas Pasley
Preceded by John Bazely (Acting)	Commander-in-Chief, The Downs; 1799–1802	Succeeded by Edward Thornbrough
