= HMS Carcass (1759) =

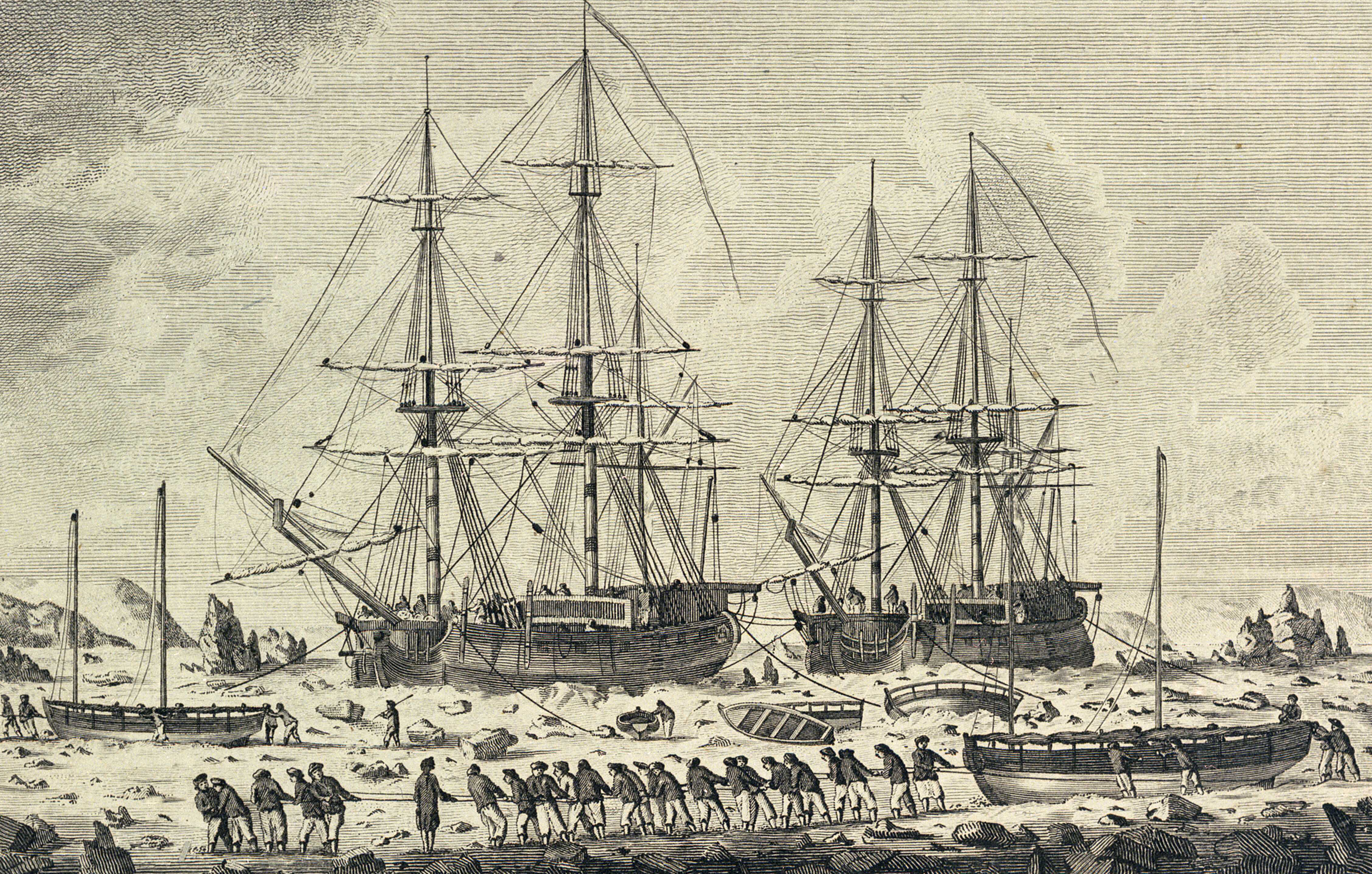
- Carcass (right) stranded in the ice on 7 August 1773

History

Great Britain
- Name: HMS Carcass
- Ordered: 21 September 1758
- Builder: Stanton & Wells, Rotherhithe
- Laid down: 28 September 1758
- Launched: 27 January 1759
- Commissioned: 27 June 1759
- Out of service: Paid off in December 1781
- Fate: Sold on 5 August 1784

General characteristics
- Class & type: Infernal-class bomb vessel
- Tons burthen: 309
- Length: 91 ft 8 in (27.94 m) (overall); 74 ft (23 m) (keel)
- Beam: 28 ft (8.5 m)
- Draught: 8 ft 9 in (2.67 m) (normal); 10 ft 6 in (3.20 m) (full)
- Depth of hold: 12 ft 1 in (3.68 m)
- Propulsion: Sails
- Sail plan: Full-rigged ship
- Complement: 60 (110 as sloop)
- Armament: 8 × 6-pdrs; 14 × 1/2-pdr swivels; 1 × 13 in mortar; 1 × 10 in mortar; (14 × 6-pdrs as sloop)

HMS Carcass was an Infernal-class bomb vessel of the Royal Navy, later refitted as a survey vessel. A young Horatio Nelson served aboard her as a midshipman on an expedition to the Arctic in 1773.

== Design and construction ==
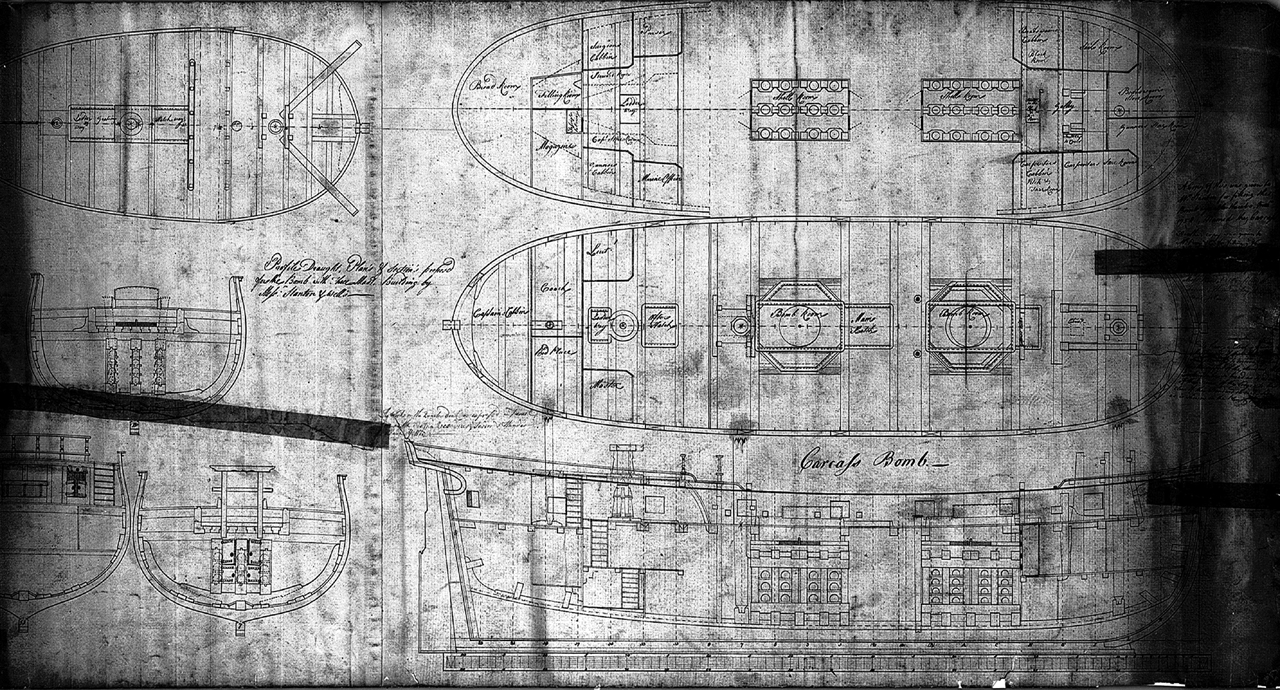
Plan showing Carcass's inboard profile, sections, upper deck and hold

The Infernal class were designed by Thomas Slade. Carcass was ordered from Stanton & Wells, Rotherhithe on 21 September 1758 and launched on 27 January 1759, having been named over a week previously on 19 January. Carcass was commissioned as a sloop at Deptford Dockyard on 27 June 1759, having cost £3,757.14.6d to build, and a further £2,144.8.1d spent on fitting out.

== Career ==
Carcass's first commander was Charles Inglis, who took her to join Admiral George Rodney's squadron in the English Channel. The vessel was present at the bombardment of Le Havre on 3 July 1759, and the following year captured the 10-gun Mercury off La Rochelle. She was refitted in March 1760 for £531.15.1d, and again in 1761. The sloop was recommissioned in January 1762 under the command of Lord William Campbell, before being refitted again, this time as a bomb vessel between February and March 1762. She came under the command of Robert Fanshawe in August 1762, before being paid off in 1763. A series of repairs and refits were carried out over the next two years, before Carcass was recommissioned in August 1765 under Captain Mark Pattison. Pattison sailed her to Jamaica in October 1765, and by September 1766 she was under Thomas Jordan. Further repairs at Deptford followed, before she was recommissioned in June 1771 under Commander Skeffington Lutwidge, serving in the Irish Sea.

Carcass was paid off in April 1773, before undergoing a refit at Sheerness in preparation for an expedition to the Arctic. The refit cost £2,895.8.8d, and on its completion, she joined Constantine Phipps's expedition towards the North Pole. Horatio Nelson was assigned to Carcass as a midshipman, through the influence of his uncle, Maurice Suckling. They managed to reach within ten degrees of the North Pole, but were forced back by the ice, and returned to Britain in September 1773. By 1800 Lutwidge began to circulate a story that while the ship had been trapped in the ice, Nelson had seen and pursued a polar bear, before being ordered to return to the ship. Lutwidge's later version, in 1809, reported that Nelson and a companion had given chase to the bear, and on being questioned why, replied that "I wished, Sir, to get the skin for my father."

After the conclusion of the Arctic expedition, Carcass was again paid off, recommissioning again in January 1775 under Commander James Reid for service on the African coast. She was again paid off, in September that year, followed by another series of refits. Carcass sailed to North America in May 1776 under Commander Robert Dring, who was succeeded by John Howorth in February 1777. After a period under the command of Thomas Barker, the vessel came under the command of Edward Edwards, who took her to the West Indies with William Hotham in 1780. She was under John Young, off the Leeward Islands by the end of 1780, and was paid off in December 1781. The vessel was finally sold at Woolwich for £320 on 5 August 1784.

== See also ==
- European and American voyages of scientific exploration
