= Basire =

Basire is a surname. Notable people with the surname include:

- Claude Basire (1764–1794), French politician
- Isaac Basire (1607–1676), French-born English divine and traveler
- Isaac Basire (engraver) (1704–1768), English map maker
- James Basire (1730–1802), English engraver, son of Isaac Basire, the engraver and map maker
