= Store Kannikestræde 6 =

Listed buildings in Copenhagen

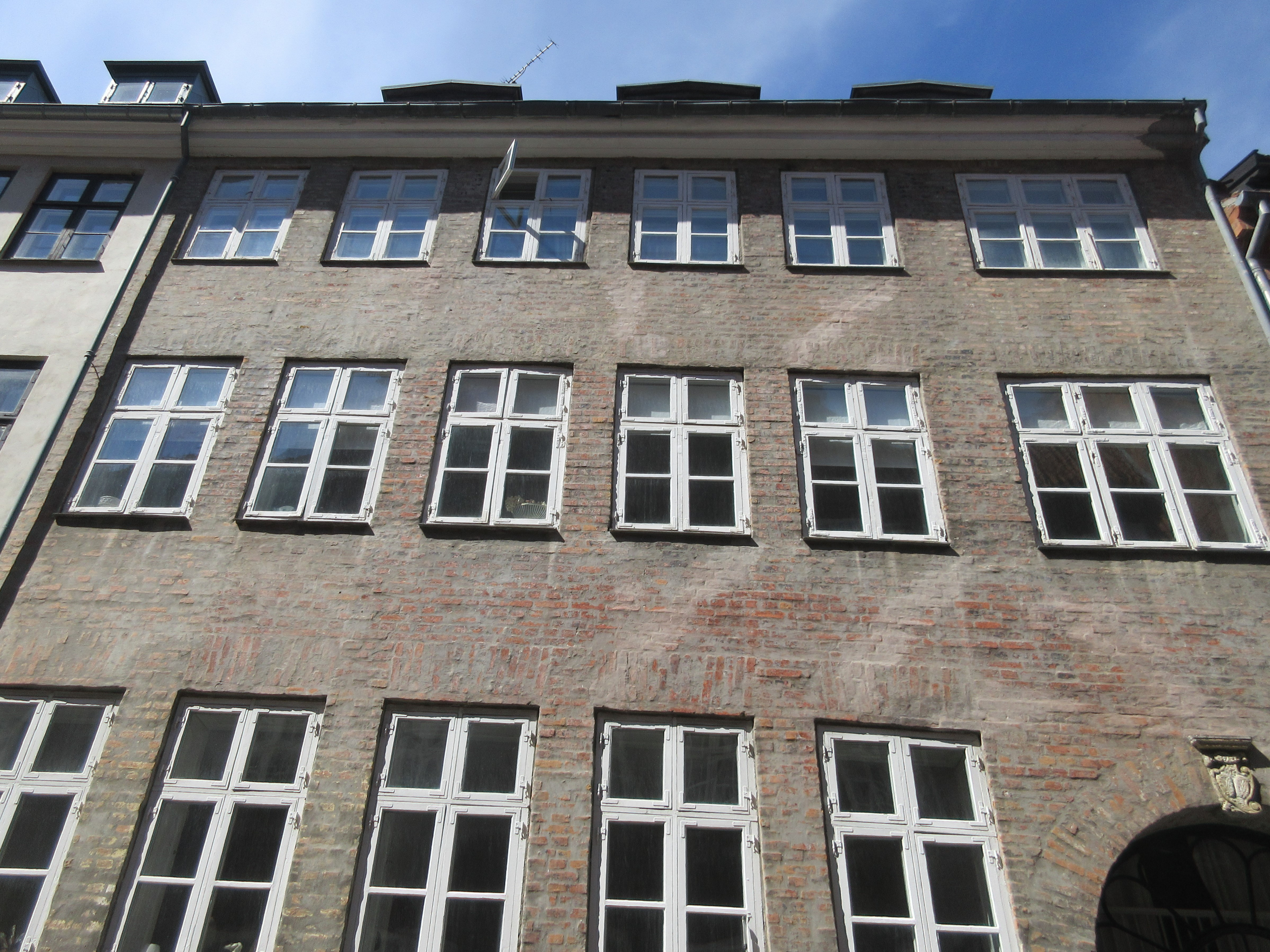
- Interactive map of the Store Kannikestræde 6 area

General information
- Location: Copenhagen, Denmark
- Coordinates: 55°40′50.7″N 12°34′29.78″E
- Completed: 1730s

Store Kannikestræde 6 is an 18th-century building situated in Store Kannikestræde in the Old Town of Copenhagen, Denmark. It was constructed in the second half of the 1730s as part of the rebuilding of the city following the Copenhagen Fire of 1728, and later heightened with one storey in the 1790s. It was listed in the Danish registry of protected buildings and places in 1945. Notable former residents include the antiquarian bookdealer Herman H. J. Lynge and publisher and editor Gottlieb Siesbye.

== History ==
=== 18th century ===
Store Kannikestræde 6–10 was formerly the site of a large mansion known as Kanslergården, owned by Vice Chancellor Holger Vind. His widow Marie née Giede kept the property upon his death in 1683. Her property was listed in Copenhagen's first cadastre of 1689 as No. 43 in Klædebo Quarter. Upon her death it was passed to their son Wilhelm Carl Wind, owner of Harrestedgård. On his death just two years later, it passed to his relative Frederik Eiler Gedde, his widow Abel Cathrine von Buchwald and finally to Johan Friderich Brockenhuus.

In 1722, Kanslergården was acquired by Abraham Lehn. Lehn resided in the Lehn House in Christianshavn and therefore never himself lived in the building. It was instead let out to foreign envoys. The mansion was completely destroyed in the Copenhagen Fire of 1728, together with most of the other buildings in Klædebo Quarter. In the summer of 1734, Lehn sold the fire site to master builder Oluf Lange. Lange divided the large property into 10 parcels of land towards Skidenstræde and another three parcels of land towards Store Kannikestræde. In September 1736, he sold the southwestern parcel of land in Store Kannikestræde (now Store Kannikestræde 10) to Sevastian Lier. Lier had earlier the same year also bought a property on the other side of the block from him (now Krystalgade 5). Lier was at the same time granted a 3,500 rigsdaler loan from Lange with security in the buildings that he was going to construct on the site. In December, Lier also acquired the two adjacent properties in Store Kannikestræde (now Store Kannikestræde 6–8). Very little is known about Lier. He is in different sources referred to as studiosus, master builder (Ramsing) and "commissioner".In the 1730s, he was involved in a considerable number of construction projects. The three buildings were completed around a year later. As part of their contract with Lange, Lier was obliged to have the buildings insured by the recently established Kjøbenhavns Brandforsikring. On 30 December 1737, Lier insured the northeastern building for 4,000 rigsdaler. On 23 December 1737, he obtained a 3,000 rigsdaler loan from Sophie Haxthausen with security in the building. He was initially himself a resident of the building, although he later moved to Store Kannikestræde 10. Both Lier and Lange disappeared from the sources around 1740–41.

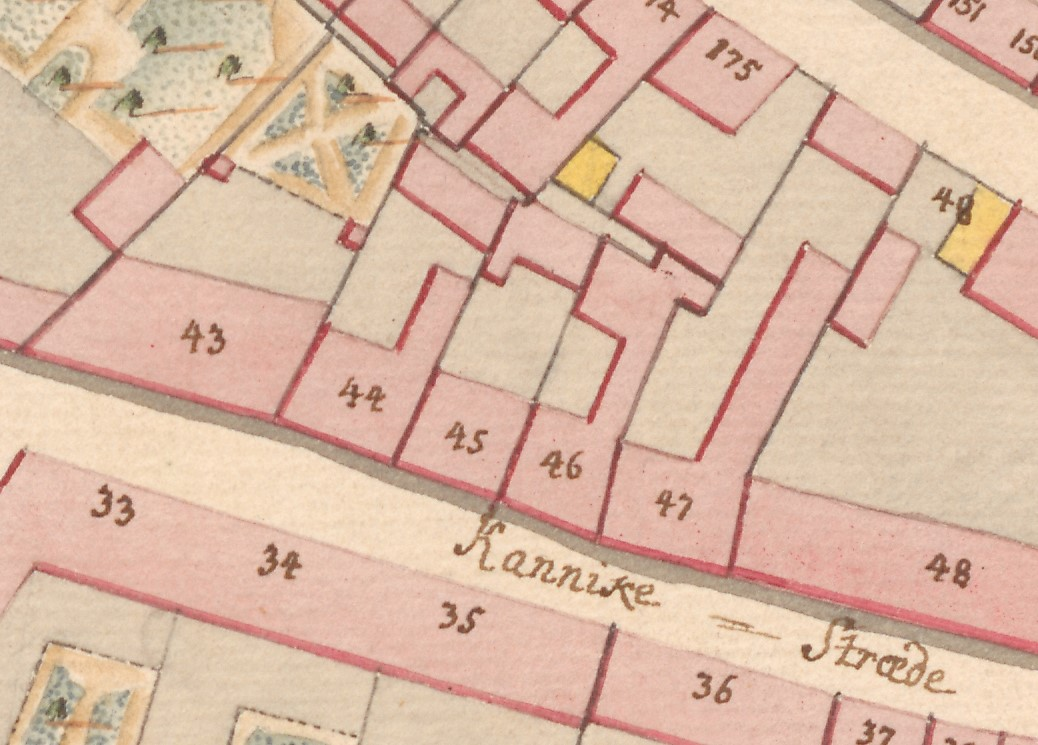
No. 45, seen in a detail from Christian Gedde's map of Klædebo Quarter, 1757

The property now known as Store Kannikestræde 6 was later acquired by chief justice in Borgerretten Truels Ortwed. His property was listed in the new cadastre of 1756 as No. 46 in Klædebo Quarter. The two adjacent buildings in Store Kannikestræde were listed as No. 45 (Store Kannikestræde 8) and No. 44 (Store Kannikestræde 10). In 1771, Ortwed was appointed as judge at Hof- og Stadsretten.

Truels Ortwed was still the owner of the building at the 1787 census. He lived there with his employee Johan Christian Thønnesen, a maid, a male servant and a female cook.

=== 19th century ===
The property was home to 28 residents at the 1801 census. Nicolai Hilde Brandt, a merchant, resided in the building with his wife Anne Wraae Kampmann, the widow Kirstine Maria Thorhrum and one maid. 15 lodgers resided together on the first floor. Friderich Christiansen, a carpenter, resided on the second floor with his wife Johanne Christensdatter and their two children (aged two and eight). Marcus Simoni, an 85-year-old man, resided on the same floor with his wife Dorthe Marie Rane and two lodgers. Mads Bierregaard, a former beer seller (øltapper), resided in the basement.

The front wing was listed in the new cadastre of 1806 as No. 47 in Klædebo Quarter. It belonged to one Niels Kampmannat at that time.

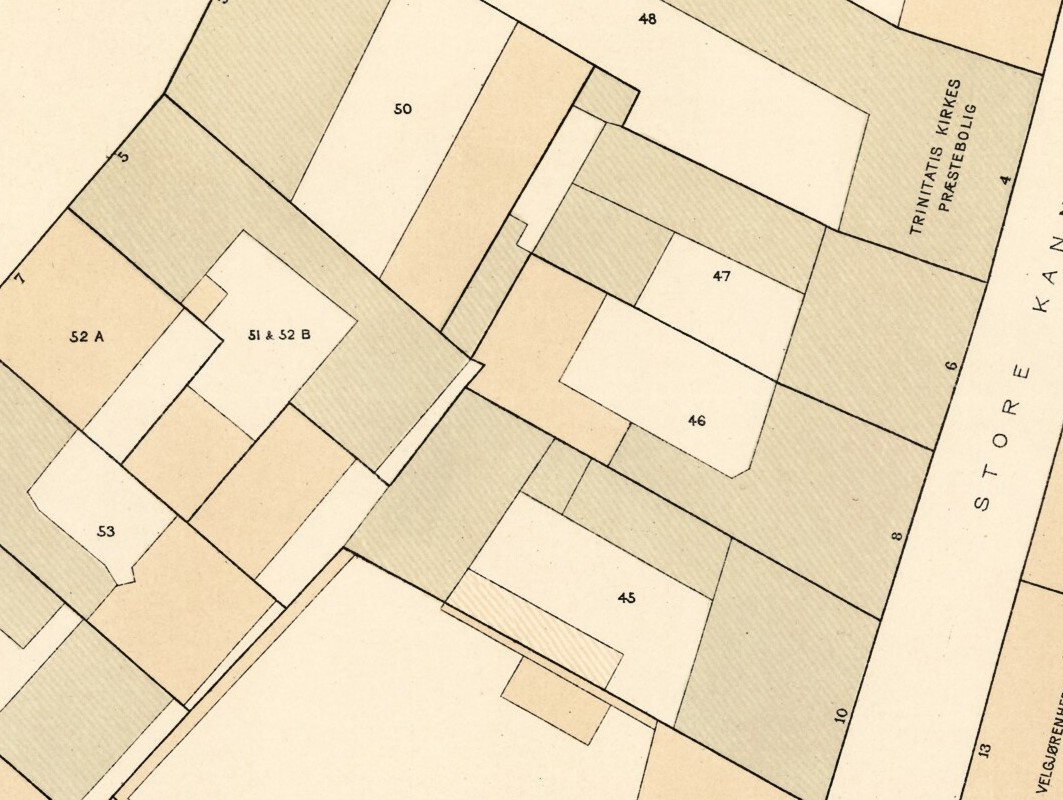
Store Kannilestræde 6 (No. 47) seen in one of Berggreen's block plans of Klædebo Quarter, 1886–88. Notice the two now demolished side wings.

The property was home to 33 residents at the 1845 census. Hans Peter Jofoed Höhling, a commander of the 10th Battalion, resided on the ground floor with his wife Wilhelmine Caroline Höhling (née Olsen), their three children (aged two to seven) and two maids. Hans Christian From, a carpenter, resided on the ground floor with his wife Augenette From. Emilie Marie Smidt (née von der Wettering), widow of justitsråd Anton Ferdinand Smidt, resided on the first floor with her five children (aged five to 14), her sister-in-law Dorthea Christine Smidt and one maid. Peter Larsen, a cand.theol. and the publisher of Morgenposten, resided on the first floor with his wife Emma Anine Caroline Larsen (née Nielsen) and their three-year-old son. The property was home to 26 residents at the 1845 census. Lauritz Frederik Fischer, a senior clerk (fuldmægtig), resided on the second floor with his wife Sophie Frederikke Fischer, their three children (aged three to eight) and one maid. Margrethe Lyngbye, a widow supplementing her pension with needlework, resided on the first floor with her daughter Antoinette Lyngbye. Poul Quist, a master shoemaker, resided in the basement with his wife Catrine Erasmine Qvist, their two children (aged two and six) and one lodger.

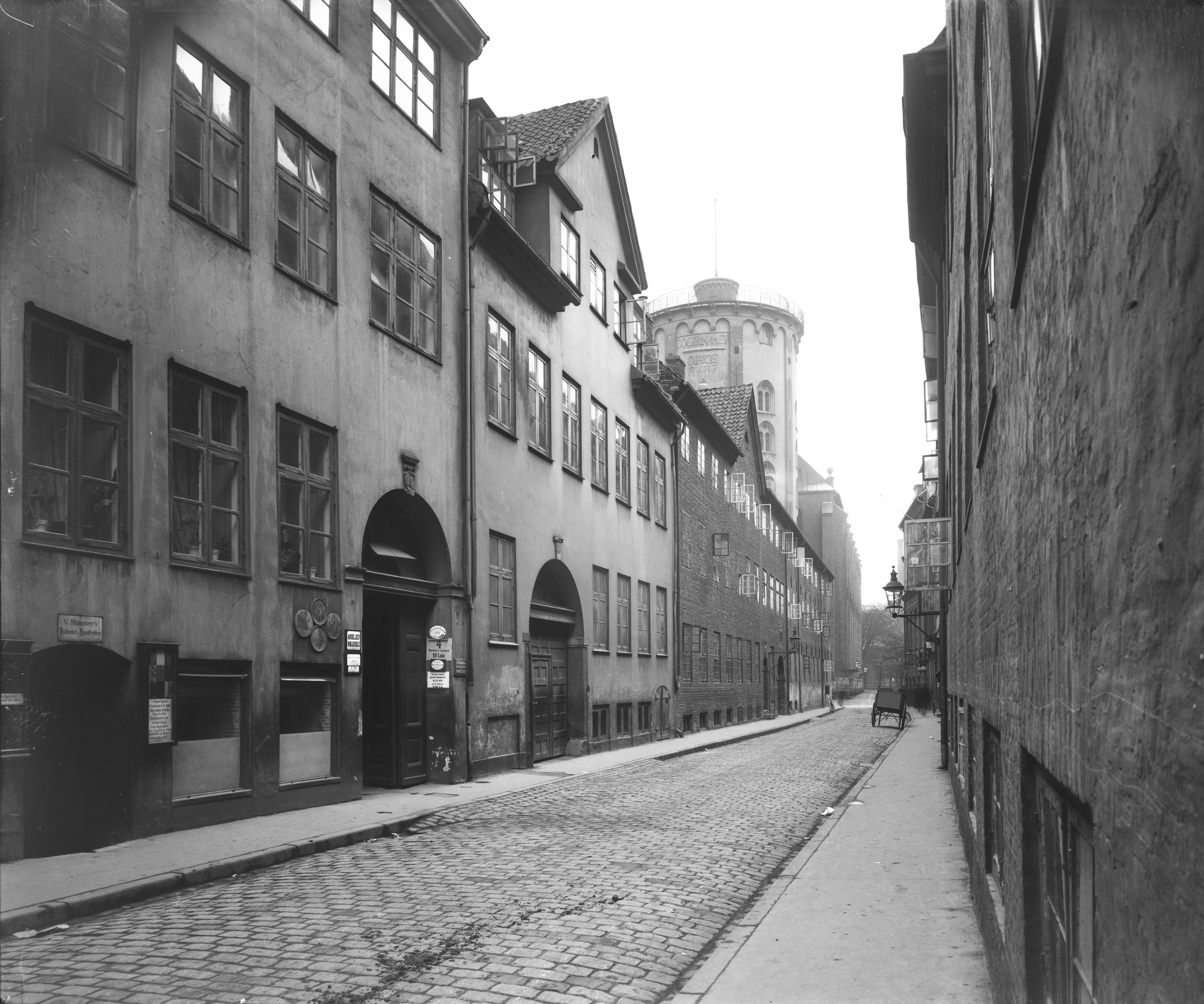
Store Kannikestræde 6-10, photographed by Johannes Hauerslev

The property was home to 58 residents at the 1860 census. Herman H. J. Lynge (1822–1897), a bookdealer, resided on the ground floor with his wife Wilhelmine Andersen. Marthies Levin Trier, a businessman (handelsfuldmægtig), resided on the first floor with his wife Sophie (née Trier) and one maid. Emiil Gotholdt Ludvig Nærum, a middagsabonnent, resided on the first floor of the side wing and rear wing with his wife Georgine Petrea Mathine Marie (née Michaelsen), their two children (aged three and four), two maids and the law students Ivar Qvistgaard Leth and Niels Jørgen Leth. Jacob Andersen Baadstrup, rodemester of Kldebo Quarter, resided in one of the second-floor apartments with his wife Wilhelmine Amalie Frederikke (née Nyssum), his mother-in-law Caroline Frederikke Johanne (née Erlandsen), his sister-in-law Henriette Sophie Wilhelmine (née Nyssum) and one maid. Christian Anthon Møller, a master saddler, resided on the second floor of the side wing with his sister Cathrine Frederikke Christine Møller (tailor). Clausine Mainung (née Halvorsen), a widow employed with needlework, resided in the other second-floor apartment with her three children (aged five to 20). Gottlieb Stobbe, a master shoemaker, resided in the garret with his wife Augusta Karoline Sophie (née Bergreen), their one-year-old son and the lodger Adolph Emil Morville (journalist). Niels Nielsen, a langsaugskjærer, resided in the basement with his wife Caroline (née Lund) and their seven children (aged two to 13). Frants Nielsen, a workman, resided in the basement with his wife Berthe Marie (née Petersen), their seven-year-old son and four lodgers. Claus Christian Guldbrandsen, a clerk, resided on the ground floor of the rear wing with his wife Anne Magrethe (née Taysen) with their five-year-old daughter. Peter Danielsen, a corps-carrier, resided on the ground floor of the rear wing with his wife Johanne f. Olsen and three of their children. Wilhelm Edvard Rust, a koiner (snedkersvend), resided on the second floor of the rear wing with his wife Laurine Dorthea (née Jonassen) and their two-year-old daughter. Carl Emil Keller, a goldworker (guldarbejder), resided on the second floor of the rear wing with his wife Johanne Marie (née Hemmingsen) and their one-year-old son.

Gottlieb Siesbye (1803-1884), publisher of Flyveposten, a newspaper, resided in one of the apartments from 1869 to 1871. Flyveposten closed in 1870.

== Architecture ==
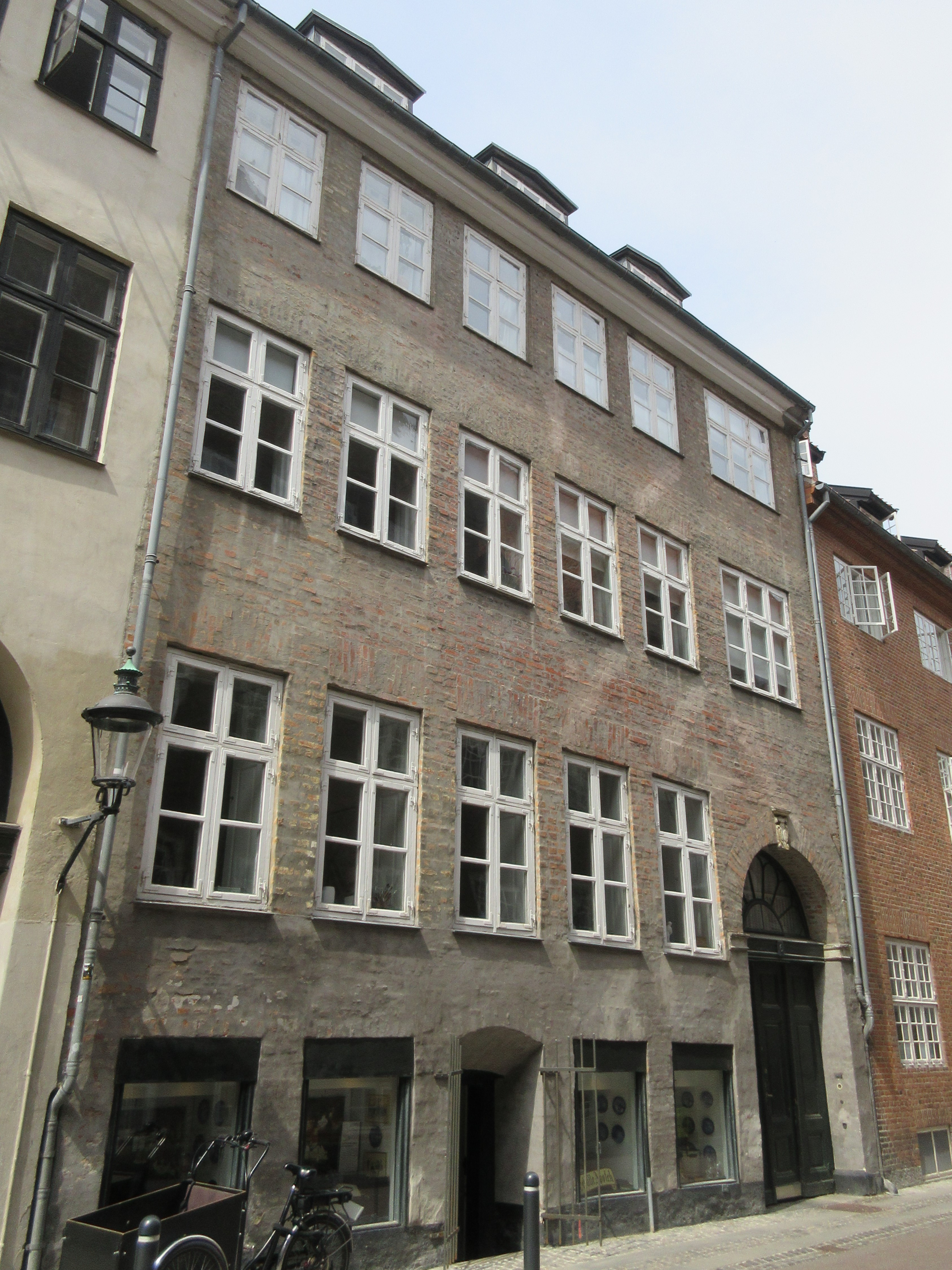
Store Kannikestræde 6

Store Kannikestræde 6 is constructed with three storeys over a walk-out basement. The third storey was added in the 1790s, replacing a five-bay gabled wall dormer similar to the one at Store Kannikestrlde 10. A green-painted gate with fanlight is located in the bay furthest to the right. The keystone features a cartouche with a no longer readable monogram. The basement entrance is located in the third bay from the left. The rear side of the building was originally constructed with timber framing but was later reconstructed in brick. The pitched roof is pierced by a robust chimney. The roof features three dormer windows facing towards the street and another three towards the yard.

A four-bays-long side wing extends from the rear side of the building along the east side of a central courtyard. It is connected to a five-bays-wide side wing. A just one-bay-long side wing extends from the rear sid4e of the rear wing along the east side of a small light well. The side wing and rear wing are partly constructed with timber framing.

== Todau ==
The property is today owned by E/F Store Kannikestræde 6. It contains a single condominium on each floor of the front wing, and office space in the rear wing.
