= Vetusta Monumenta =

1718–1906 series of antiquarian papers

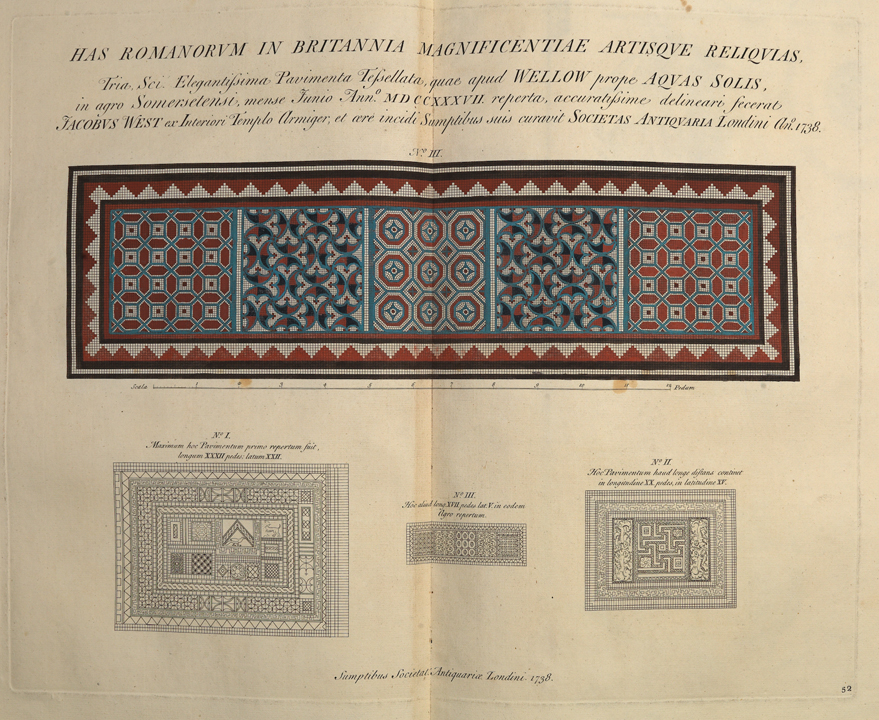
Roman mosaics from Wellow, near Bath, Somerset: double-page spread in volume 1, in an 1826 reprint

Vetusta Monumenta is the title of a published series of illustrated antiquarian papers on ancient buildings, sites and artefacts, mostly those of Britain, published at irregular intervals between 1718 and 1906 by the Society of Antiquaries of London. The folio-sized papers, usually written by members of the society, were first published individually, and then later in collected volumes.

== Publication ==
The full title is Vetusta monumenta quae ad Rerum Britanicarum memoriam conservandam Societas Antiquariorum Londini sumptu suo edenda curavit, but the volumes are normally simply cited as Vetusta Monumenta. There were various reprints of both individual papers and collected volumes, and the plates were often published separately from the text. According to the HOLLIS database at Harvard: "The seven volumes are dated 1747, 1789, 1796, 1815, 1835, 1883 and 1906 (for the fourth part of vol. 7). The plates for vol. 1 were published between 1718 and 1747; plates for vol. 2 were published between 1748 and 1789; plates for vol. 3 were published between 1790 and 1796; plates for vol. 4 were published between 1799 and 1815; plates for vol. 5 were published between 1816 and 1835; plates for vol. 6 were published between 1821 and 1885; plates for the four parts of vol. 7 were published between 1893 and 1906."

The series began the same year that the society formalised its existence with the first minuted meeting on 1 January 1718 at the Mitre Tavern, Fleet Street; the society's main journal Archaeologia did not begin publication until 1770. Members of the society received a free copy as each part was published.

== Contents ==
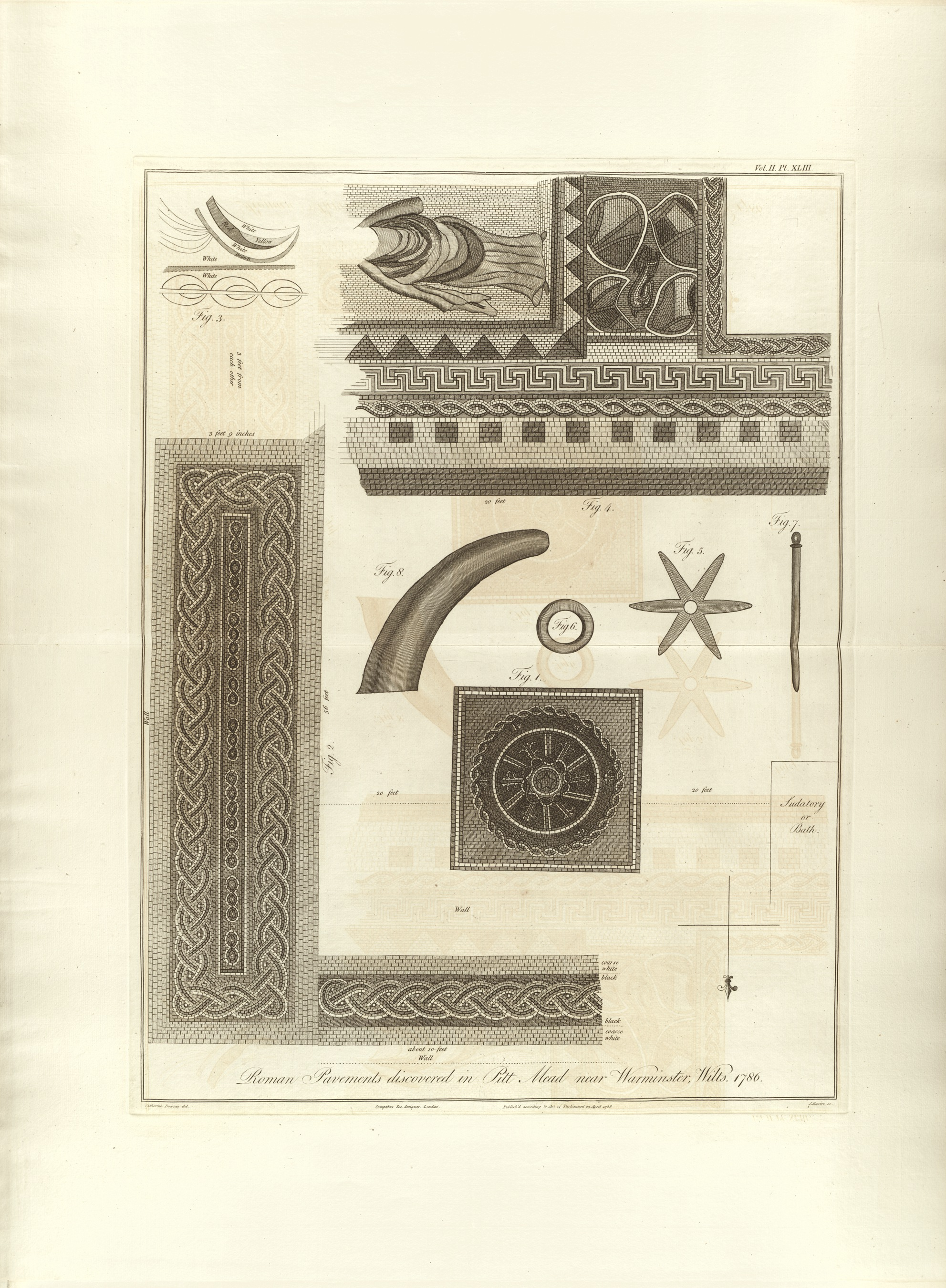
Pit Mead Roman villa mosaic, illustrations by Catherine Downes, engraved by James Basire and presented to the Society of Antiquaries by Daines Barrington

The emphasis was on the large and detailed illustrations, initially high-quality engravings, which conveyed information on the subject matter in an accessible and economical way. Each issue was usually developed from papers and research of the society, giving a text description accompanied by illustrated details it had commissioned. The assemblage of maps, site plans and other details was a novelty that found popular appeal.

The views in the series contained images of people and other means of conveying scale, providing the perspective of the interested visitor. These accompanied text descriptions for the sites, but provided additional information with high levels of detail and multiple or idealised viewpoints to simulate a well-informed tour. Many of the plates show the setting, inset with exploded views, cross sections and other architectural details, or objects found at the site. Other figures were interspersed with the text, or taking up several full pages. Critics have compared this approach with contemporaneous works that included the subject as an attractively sketched scene, illustrations were not yet recognised as a valuable source of information. The book used the multiple and separate details to synthesise encyclopaedic surveys that typified the approach of the natural historians and antiquaries, what Barbara Maria Stafford has described as "cross-referencing material bits of distant reality".

An 1803 article on the Rosetta Stone was amongst the earliest-published research. The first detailed account of the medieval French Royal Gold Cup in the British Museum was published in one of the last papers, of 1904, by Sir Charles Hercules Read.

== Contributors ==
The following is an incomplete list of noted contributors, and their articles:

- Thomas Astle
- Thomas Amyot, a description of Tewkesbury Abbey
- William Wilkins, "Observations on the Porta Honoris of Caius College, Cambridge"
- George Gwilt the Younger, architect
- Browne Willis, "A Table of the Gold Coins of the Kings of England" (1733)
- Thomas Walford (iii. pt. 39)

Notices on illustrations mention the following engravers:

- George Vertue, engraver to the society. Produced a drawing of the Holbein Gate in 1724, his 1727 engraving appears in volume 1, 1747. Other works include the portrait of Richard II at Westminster, the shrine of Edward the Confessor, and a view of Waltham Cross; nearly all the copperplate to 1756 was engraved by Vertue.
- James Basire (1730–1802), one of Vertue's successors, who produced large and exquisite design on copperplate. His descendants of the same name, the son James Basire (1769–1822) and grandson (1796–1869), were also appointed engraver of the Society. His work for the volumes—after his appointment in the 1760s—is described as amongst his best; however,
- William Blake, Basire's apprentice is thought to be partly, if not largely, responsible for many of the designs.
- Charles Alfred Stothard, coloured facsimile of the Bayeux Tapestry in 1818
- Jacob Schnebbelie (d. 1826), draughtsman to the society. Executed many of the architectural views of the second and third volumes.
- Samuel Hieronymous Grimm
