= Thomas Walford =

English archaeologist (1752–1833)

Thomas Walford (1752–1833) was an English antiquary.

== Life ==
Walford, born on 14 September 1752, was the only son of Thomas Walford (d. 1756) of Whitley, near Birdbrook in Essex, by his wife, Elizabeth Spurgeon (d. 1789) of Linton in Cambridgeshire. He was an officer in the Essex militia in 1777, and was appointed deputy lieutenant of the county in 1778. In March 1797 he was nominated captain in the provisional cavalry, and in May following was gazetted major.

In February 1788 Walford was elected a fellow of the Society of Antiquaries, in October 1797 a fellow of the Linnean Society, in 1814 a member of the Geological Society, and in 1825 a fellow. In 1818 he published The Scientific Tourist through England, Wales, and Scotland (London, 2 vols. 12mo). In this work he noticed "the principal objects of antiquity, art, science, and the picturesque" in Great Britain, under the heads of the several counties. In an introductory essay he dealt with the study of antiquities and the elements of statistics, geology, mineralogy, and botany. The work is too comprehensive to be exhaustive, and its value varies with Walford's personal knowledge of the places he describes.

Walford died at Whitley on 6 August 1833. He published several papers in antiquarian periodicals (e.g. Archæologia, xiv. 24, xvi. 145–50; Vetusta Monumenta, iii. pt. 39; Linnean Soc. Trans. lix. 156), and left several manuscripts, including a history of Birdbrook in Essex and another of Clare in Sussex.[Suffolk?]
