= Catherine Downes =

English antiquarian and archaeologist

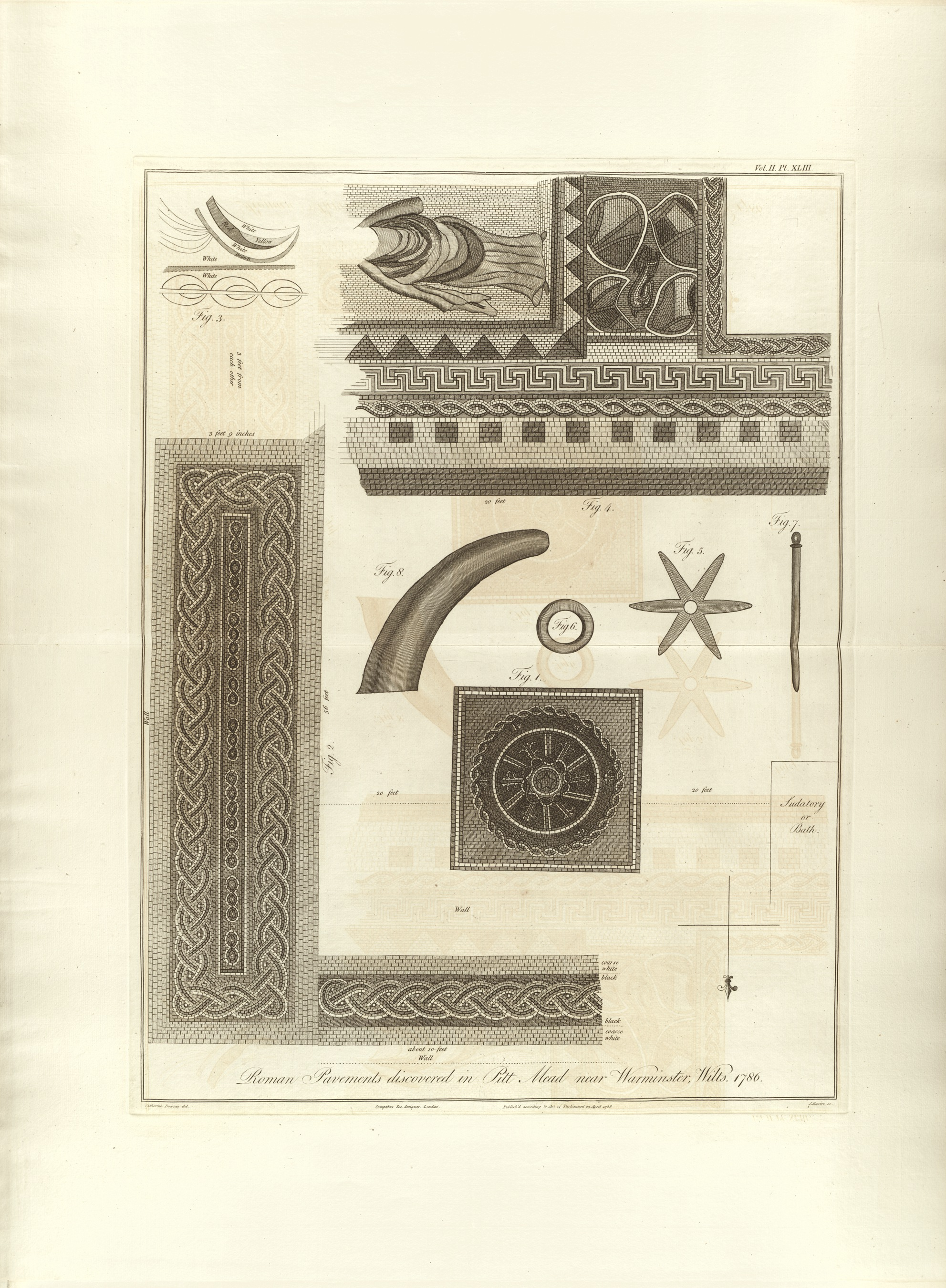
Pit Mead Roman villa mosaic, illustration by Catherine Downes, engraved by James Basire

Catherine Downes (fl. 1786) was an English antiquarian and archaeologist, who excavated a Roman villa near Warminster, Wiltshire, in 1786. Downes is a significant figure in the early history of archaeology, since she was one of the first women antiquarians to excavate a Roman site; the other was Frances Stackhouse Acton. Downes is also one of the earliest recorded women who contributed to the work of the Society of Antiquaries of London.

== Pit Mead Roman villa ==
Downes initially learnt of the find by a farmworker through an article in the Salisbury Journal, she then employed an assistant and gained permission to excavate. The site was located at a place called Pit Mead, just outside Warminster, on land owned by Lord Weymouth. The investigations revealed four mosaics, a bath house and a range of finds. The finds included pottery, coins, bone and metal objects and an ivory bodkin. The mosaic illustrated by Downes and Basire was removed from the site and taken to Longleat, as of 2021 its location was unknown.

She reported on the results of her excavation to the Society of Antiquaries of London in a letter they received on 10 March 1788. The letter was read to the society by Daines Barrington. It was accompanied by her illustrations of pavements and finds from the villa, which were later engraved by James Basire and published in Vetusta Monumenta.

Whilst her descriptions of the finds show that she was not familiar with Latin literature, they do demonstrate that she was familiar with the principles of archaeological enquiry (then in its very infancy) and how to describe and record finds in detail.
