= Charles Hercules Read =

British archaeologist and curator (1857–1929)

Sir Charles Hercules Read FSA FRAI FBA
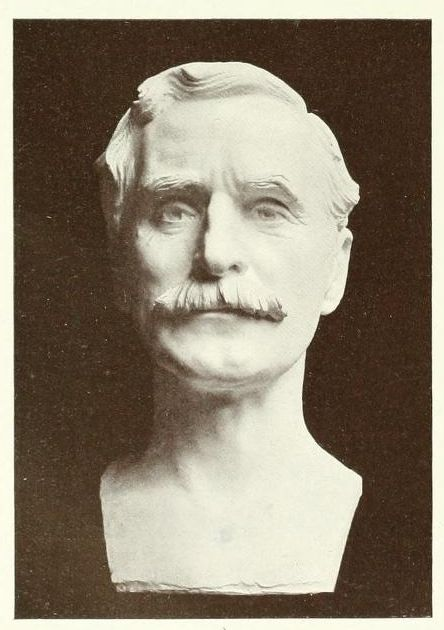
- Bust by Henry Pegram
- Born: 6 July 1857
- Died: 11 February 1929 (aged 71); Rapallo, Italy

Academic background
- Education: University of Edinburgh (honorary doctorate)

Sir Charles Hercules Read FSA FRAI FBA (6 July 1857 – 11 February 1929) was a British archaeologist and curator who became Keeper of British and Mediaeval Antiquities and Ethnography at the British Museum, and President of the Society of Antiquaries of London, following his mentor Augustus Wollaston Franks in the first position in 1896, and in the second from 1908 to 1914 and again from 1919 to 1924, after being Secretary since 1892. He began periods as President of the Royal Anthropological Institute of Great Britain and Ireland in 1899 and 1917. He was knighted in 1912 and retired from the British Museum in 1921. He usually dropped the "Charles" in his name, especially after he was knighted, though not consistently. "A man of handsome and even striking appearance", he was a major figure in British museum curation in his day, though he published relatively little.

== Career ==
Read was privately educated, with no university degree before he received an honorary doctorate from the University of Edinburgh in 1908. His first museum job was as secretary to a senior curator at the South Kensington Museum, now the Victoria and Albert Museum, where he came to know Franks. Franks then used him to work on the registration of the important collection of Ice Age art, ethnography and other objects of Henry Christy, which were then kept in a flat in Victoria Street, and of which Franks was a trustee. Much of the collection ended up in the British Museum under the terms of Christy's will. In 1880 he joined the British Museum itself as Franks' assistant, marrying the same year.

As Keeper he was responsible for beginning the publication of catalogues, guides, books and booklets that brought awareness of the collections to a wider public. He employed the Oxford graduate Thomas Athol Joyce as an assistant in 1903. In his time the department of "British and Medieval Antiquities and Ethnography" still included areas that were later split off, such as ethnography and "oriental" collections beyond Egypt and the Near East, as well as others not obviously covered by its title, including Western ceramics and glass of all dates, and post-medieval European objects. At his retirement, this sprawling empire began to be divided. Read was notable for his knowledge across this vast range, rather than being a specialist in particular areas. Like Franks, he was popular with major collectors, helping to steer several significant donations to the museum, from J. Pierpont Morgan among others.

A rare excursion into archaeological excavation was his supervision of the excavation of the royal Anglo-Saxon cemetery at Highdown Hill in Sussex in the 1890s, which even by the standards of that date was not a model of best practice. One unfortunate episode was his advice to the Ashmolean Museum in Oxford to decline the loan of the Anglo-Saxon Fuller Brooch, which he wrongly believed to be a modern fake; after his day it was donated to the British Museum.

== Death ==
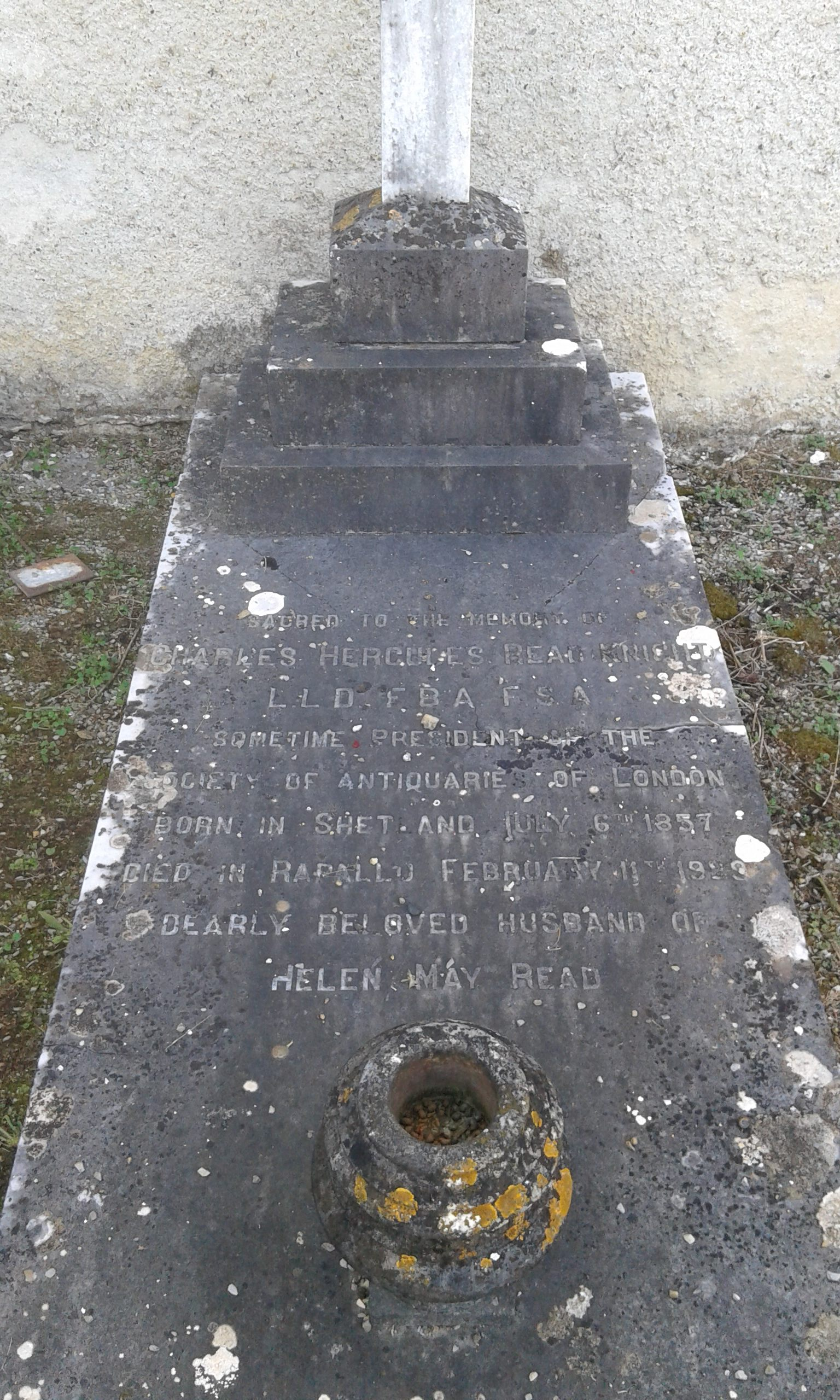
Grave of Charles Hercules Read in Rapallo

His health deteriorated after his retirement, and he spent the winters on the Riviera, dying in Rapallo, Italy on 11 February 1929. He was buried in the Cimitero Urbano.

== Publications ==
(selected)

- Read, Charles Hercules, & Dalton, Ormonde Maddock (1899). Antiquities from the city of Benin and from other parts of West Africa in the British Museum. London: British Museum.
- The Waddesdon Bequest: Catalogue of the Works of Art bequeathed to the British Museum by Baron Ferdinand Rothschild, M.P., 1898, 1902, British Museum, Fully available on the Internet archive The catalogue numbers here are still used, and may be searched for on the BM website as "WB.1" etc.
- The Royal Gold Cup of the Kings of France and England, now preserved in the British Museum. Vetusta Monumenta Volume 7, part 3, 1904, the first publication of the Royal Gold Cup
