= Isaac Basire (engraver) =

- Born: 20 September 1704; London, Middlesex, England
- Died: 24 August 1768 (aged 63)
- Children: James and 2 other sons

Isaac Basire (20 September 1704 – 24 August 1768) was an engraver and first in a family line of prolific and well-respected engravers. Isaac Basire was known as a map engraver. His most well-known work is the frontispiece to an edition of Bailey's dictionary (1755).

== Family ==
He was born in London, the son of Jacques or James Basire, a Huguenot and native of Rouen, and Magdelaine Lair. Isaac sparked a prodigious line of engravers, including his son James, grandson James (1769-1822), and great-grandson James (1796-1869). There is some difficulty in assigning works to a particular member of the family. All four worked as engravers, sometimes as an apprentice to his father, with overlapping periods of productivity, and three shared the same name.

=== James Basire ===
James Basire, also known as James Basire Sr., was the most significant of the family of engravers. He was noted for his skill at architectural prints and his apprenticing of the young William Blake.

=== James Basire II ===
James Basire the second (12 November 1769 – 13 May 1822) succeeded his father in an appointment from the Society of Antiquaries, indicating that he was a good draughtsman, a capable and accomplished engraver. His work and methods were nearly indistinguishable from his father's. Much of his best work was published by the Society of Antiquaries in 1808.

=== James Basire III ===
The last known James Basire was born in 1796 and died in London on 17 May 1869. He did a number of plates of Sussex country-houses including Glynde Place and Glyndebourne House, but his work and artistic skill were not as well-regarded.
