= Fred Rosenstock =

Austrian-American bookseller and collector

- Born: Selig Usher Rosenstock; November 29, 1895; Biala Potok, Galicia, Austria
- Died: February 15, 1986 (aged 90); Denver, Colorado, U.S.
- Occupation: Bookseller
- Spouse: Frances Goodman (m. 1926; died 1972)
- Children: Marilyn Weiker

Fred Asher Rosenstock (November 29, 1895 – February 15, 1986) was an Austrian-born American bookseller, book and art collector and publisher in Denver, Colorado from the 1920s until the mid-1980s.

== Early life ==
Fred Rosenstock was born Selig Usher Rosenstock in 1895 in Biala Potok in Galicia, then a province of Austria in the foothills of the Carpathian Mountains. His family emigrated to America in 1904. He grew up in Rochester, New York.

== Career ==
During World War I, Rosenstock moved to Washington, D.C. and worked both as a civilian and later in the US Army as a stenographer. After the war he worked for a billboard company, but became ill. He was advised to move to a dry, desert climate such as California. He went west but never got past Denver.

Rosenstock had been interested in books from his youth, and by the time he was in Washington was a collector haunting the book shops and building a small collection. In Denver he continued collecting and in 1922 opened his first bookstore, the Denver Book Shop, an antiquarian book store. It was not a success. Later after marrying Frances Goodman, in 1928, he purchased an existing book store in a good location on 15th Street in Denver and renamed it the Bargain Book Store. He continued to collect and sell rare books but the main business of the Bargain Book Store was selling school textbooks. This line got the business through the Great Depression. The store burned in 1948 and was rebuilt.

Meanwhile, Rosenstock continued his interest in rare books developing an interest in western history. By 1960, he began liquidating his general book business and in 1962 opened Fred A. Rosenstock Books on East Colfax Avenue in Denver specializing in western history. Fred had also developed an interest in western art and had collected many of the paintings and sculptures of Charles Marion Russell which he displayed in his bookstore.

Rosenstock became recognized as the leading bookseller in the field of western history and located and sold many books to the important western history collections, notably to the library at Brigham Young University and the Denver Public Library. He was also a publisher operating as the Old West Publishing Company, issuing about 30 significant books. By 1975, Rosenstock sold his extensive art collection and he closed his bookstore. In 1972, Rosenstock opened a gallery of western art, which he operated until having a stroke in 1984.

== Personal life and death ==
Rosenstock married Frances Goodman in 1926. They had a daughter, Marilyn Weiker, in 1936. Rosenstock's wife died in 1972. Rosenstock suffered a stroke in 1984 and died two years later in 1986, at the age of 90.
