= James Basire =

British engraver

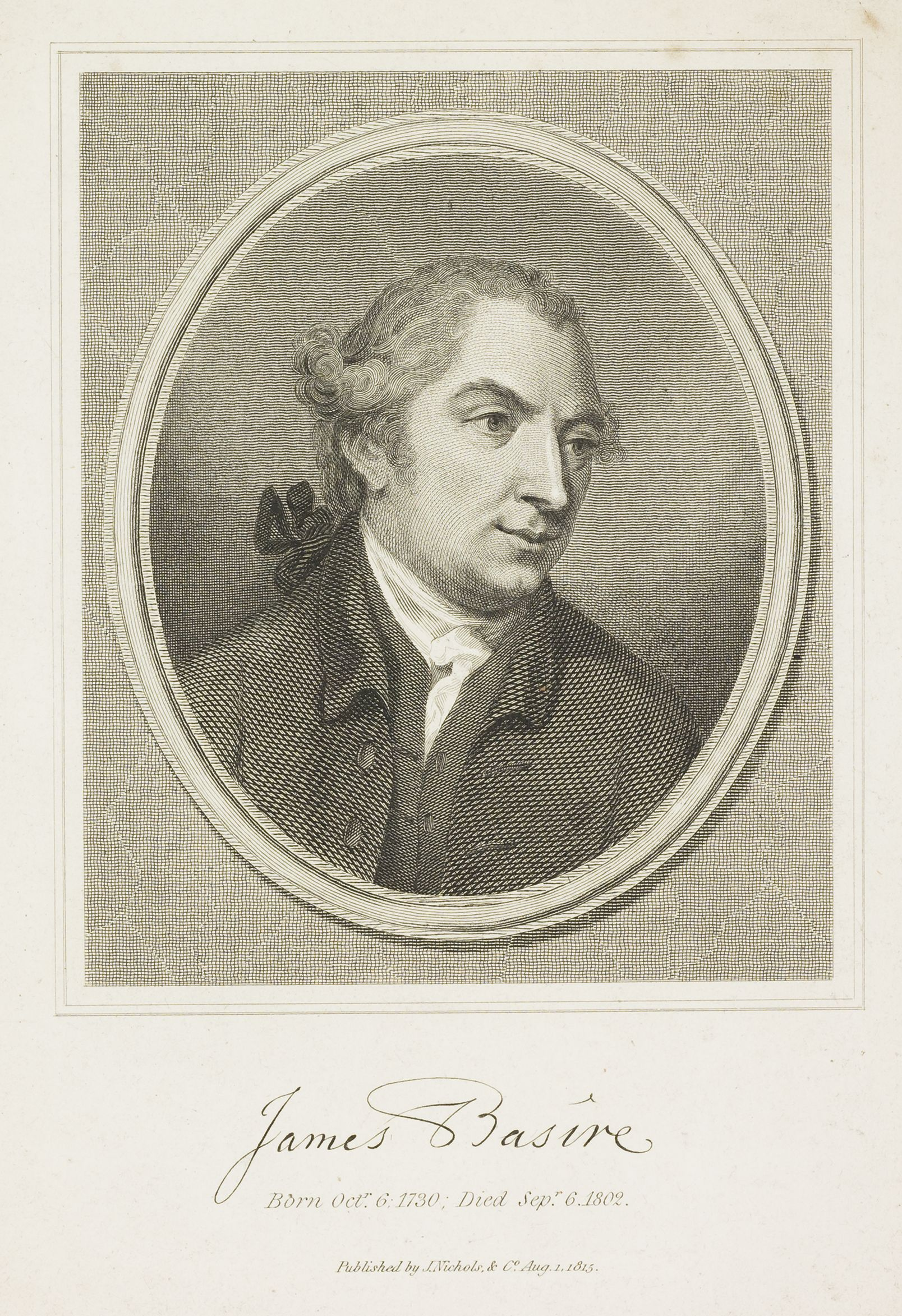
James Basire

James Basire FSA (1730–1802 London), also known as James Basire Sr., was a British engraver. He is the most significant of a family of engravers, and noted for his apprenticing of the young William Blake.

== Early life ==
His father was Isaac Basire (1704–1768), a cartographer, his son (1769–1822) and grandson (1796–1869) were also named James; these four generations of Basires were all engravers. Their longevity produced overlapping careers, which has led to difficulties in attribution of some works.

== Career ==
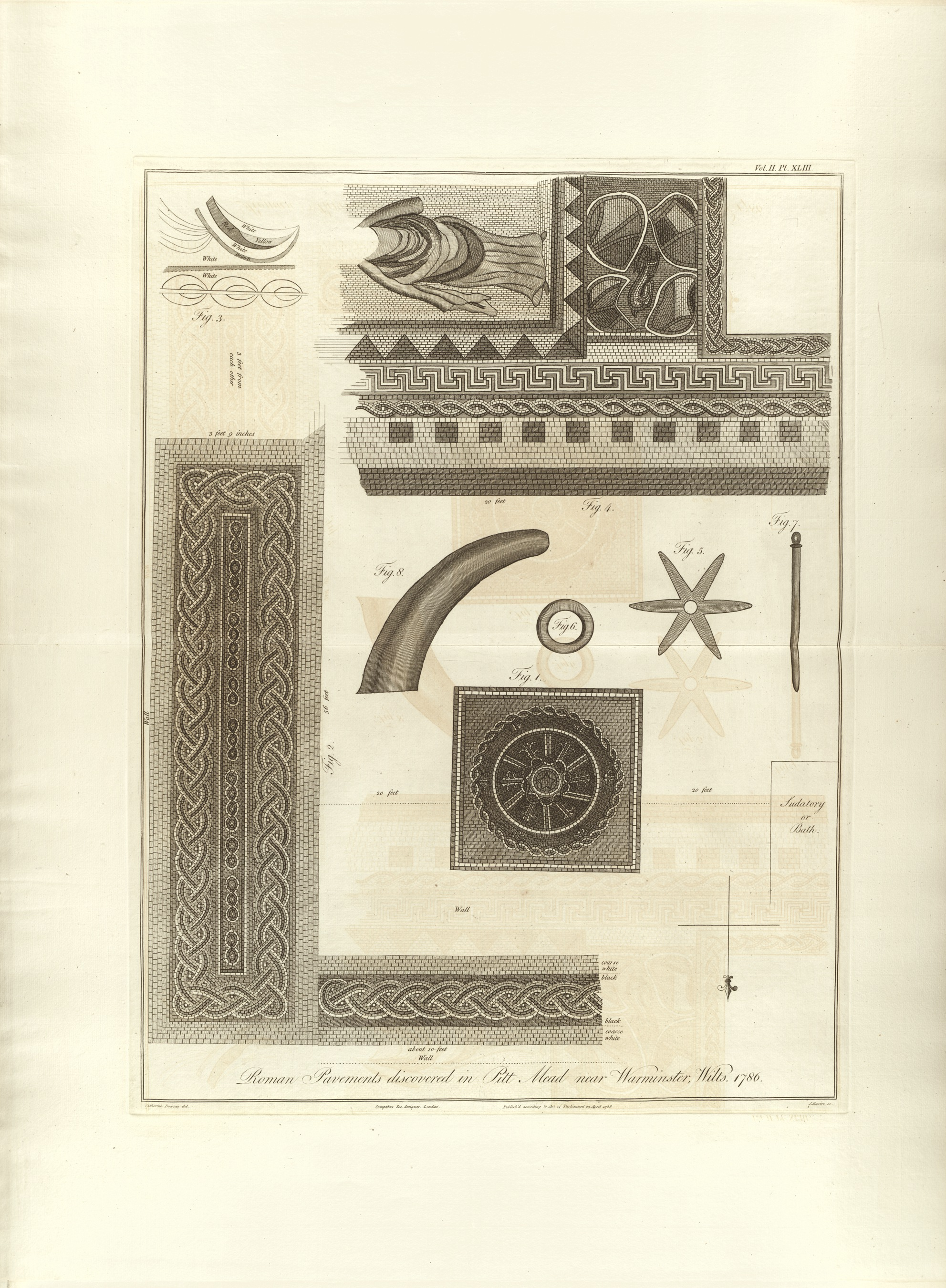
Pit Mead Roman villa mosaic, illustrations by Catherine Downes, engraved by Basire and presented to the Society of Antiquaries of London by Daines Barrington

A member of the Society of Antiquaries, James Basire specialized in prints depicting architecture. His studio was on Great Queen Street in London. His appointment as engraver to the society, as were all three generations, and much of his finest work is found in Vetusta Monumenta. A major piece was his copperplate for Field of the Cloth of Gold, an exquisitely detailed translation of a watercolour by Edward Edwards; this oversize historical print was issued on 'Antiquarian' paper. Excellent work also appeared in Richard Gough's Sepulchral Monuments.

== Legacy and work ==
Work by Basire is held in museums and galleries around the world, including the Fine Arts Museums of San Francisco, the Museum of Fine Arts, Boston, Christchurch Art Gallery, New Zealand, the National Library of Australia in Canberra, and the National Portrait Gallery, London.

On 4 August 1772, William Blake was apprenticed to Basire for the term of seven years. There is no record of any serious disagreement or conflict between the two during the period of Blake's apprenticeship. However, Peter Ackroyd's biography notes that Blake was later to add Basire's name to a list of artistic adversaries – and then crossed it out.

He assisted in the production of Stuart's Athens and engraved several good portraits of eminent men. He died in London. Among his other works were:

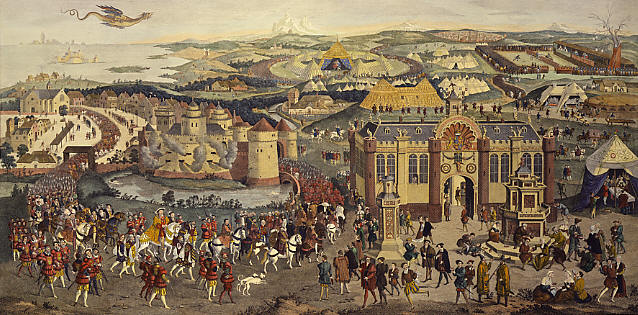
Basire's engraving depicting the Field of the Cloth of Gold

- Captain Cook; after Hodges.
- Lady Stanhope, as the Fair Penitent; after B. Wilson.
- Lord Camden; after Joshua Reynolds.
- The Field of the Cloth of Gold: Henry VIII and Francis I; after the picture at Hampton Court.
- Interview between Orestes and Pylades before Iphigenia; after Benjamin West.

Amongst Basire's apprentices were Thomas Ryder (1746–1810), George Cooke (1781–1834), and John Roffe (1769–1850).
