= Herman H. J. Lynge =

Danish bookseller (1822–1897)

- Born: November 13, 1822; Copenhagen, Denmark
- Died: May 12, 1897 (aged 74); Copenhagen, Denmark
- Awards: Knight of Dannebrog

Herman Henrik Julius Lynge (November 13, 1822 – May 12, 1897) was a Danish antiquarian bookseller. He continued and owned the first antiquarian bookshop in Scandinavia, now “Herman H. J. Lynge & Søn A/S”.

== Life ==
=== Career ===
Lynge was born in Copenhagen, Denmark, as the son of a bookbinder. At a very young age, before he was confirmed, he began his apprenticeship as a bookseller. The shop in which he took his education was carefully chosen by his father, Henrik Berndt Lynge. His master was Christian Tønder Sæbye (1789-1844), who had started his bookshop, initially a second-hand shop focusing on books, in 1821 on Gothersgade 26. After his apprenticeship, Lynge continued to work in the company.

When Sæbye died in 1844, his family continue to own the bookshop, and Lynge (aged only 22) took over as its manager. In 1853 Lynge bought the shop for 1,000 rixdollars and took out a trade licence as a bookseller. In the first years there was a cholera outbreak in Copenhagen, and Lynge is said to have done great business at the time due to the large number of private libraries offered for sale; he was the only proper “antiquarian bookseller” in Denmark, and despite the danger of infection he personally collected many books from the homes of the ill.

When N.C. Ditlewsen died in 1853, Lynge bought his stock and took over his locations in Købmagergade 45. From the advertisement section in the Copenhagen Directory of 1856 it is known that the company, initially called “Herman H.J. Lynge (Sæbyeske Boghandling)” and later simply “Herman H.J. Lynge”, had a stock of 80,000 books, including “many ancient prints, rarities, beautiful reprints, magnificent copies etc.” Due to his knowledge and the considerable size of the bookshop, Lynge had connections to almost all libraries and collectors at the time, and he supplied numerous Danish and foreign libraries with books. From the beginning he took part in book auctions, and it may have been Lynge and his staff who made the auctioneer’s sales record of the library of Søren Kierkegaard, when he died in November 1855.

By 1868, business was going extremely well for Lynge and he had to move to a larger premises, this time to Valkendorfsgade 8.

In 1871 Lynge attracted much attention, when he sold a huge Holberg collection of 425 works to the book collector F.S. Bang, who donated the collection to Sorø Academy, where it remains today. After his death it was discovered that he had created another collection of Holbergiana, this time consisting of 880 items.

=== The Man ===
Lynge was a member of several literary and scientific academies, was awarded the Danish and the Swedish gold Order of Merit, and was appointed Knight of the Swedish Vasaorden. When he turned 70, he was awarded the chancellery-title, a Danish title (Kancelliråd), which was a great honour received by few.

When the Danish poet Christian Winther was short of money, Lynge bought a selected collection of his best books, paid them in cash, as he always did, and then wrapped up the books, until Winther was able to buy back the books at the same price. He also donated books to libraries, for instance in 1864 when he presented the Danish Royal Library with a copy of the New Testament, which had belonged to the philosopher Søren Kierkegaard and had his handwritten notes in it. Due to his large collection of important and rare scientific books, he was a key figure in the scientific environment in Denmark, and often lent scientists valuable works that were necessary for their studies but too expensive for to buy. He also lent pictures from his large collection to exhibitions and for use as illustrations. Lynge was also an eager collector coins, medals, paintings, graphic art and portraits.

=== Death ===
Lynge died in 1897, and in the D.B.L. (Danish Biographical Lexicon) he is characterized as “the first proper antiquarian bookseller in Denmark", who made an important contribution to the trade in Denmark. It was said that there was not a question about books that he could not answer immediately.

== Continuation of the book shop ==
Lynge's son, Herman Johannes Vilhelm Lynge, had worked in his father’s bookshop since his confirmation. In 1892 he became an associate, and the company changed its name to “Herman H.J. Lynge & Søn A/S”. When his father died, Lynge Jr. took over the business, in spite of his immense interest in scientific zoology. He increased the stock to 300,000 volumes, enhanced the bookshop's scientific profile, and moved it to larger locations across the street in Løvstræde. Due to his encountering so many scientists in the bookshop, his interest in zoology increased, and he became an international authority in the field of molluscs and tropical mussels, mainly specializing in the left-oriented snails. Due to his expertise, he was assigned to investigate the collection of these snails brought home from the Danish expedition to Siam (1899-1900), and in 1909 his main work appeared: Marine Lamellibranchiata, containing five plates and a map and written in English. Lynge Jr. received the honour of Knight of Dannebrog. His principle of business was to “solve any assignment from best conviction”.

Herman J.V. Lynge’s son, Flemming Lynge, worked in the bookshop for a while, but was more interested in theatre, and became a writer rather than continuing the family tradition. In 1932 he sold the bookshop to Axel Sandal (1885-1974). Lynge continued to be connected to the bookshop until his retirement, and died in 1945, aged eighty-two. The leader of the bookshop became Arne Stuhr, who continued his leadership until 1974, when it was bought by Käthe and Max. In 1978, they moved the shop to Silkegade 11, where it remains today, still in the centre of Copenhagen.
