= Society of Antiquaries of London =

Learned society for historians and archaeologists

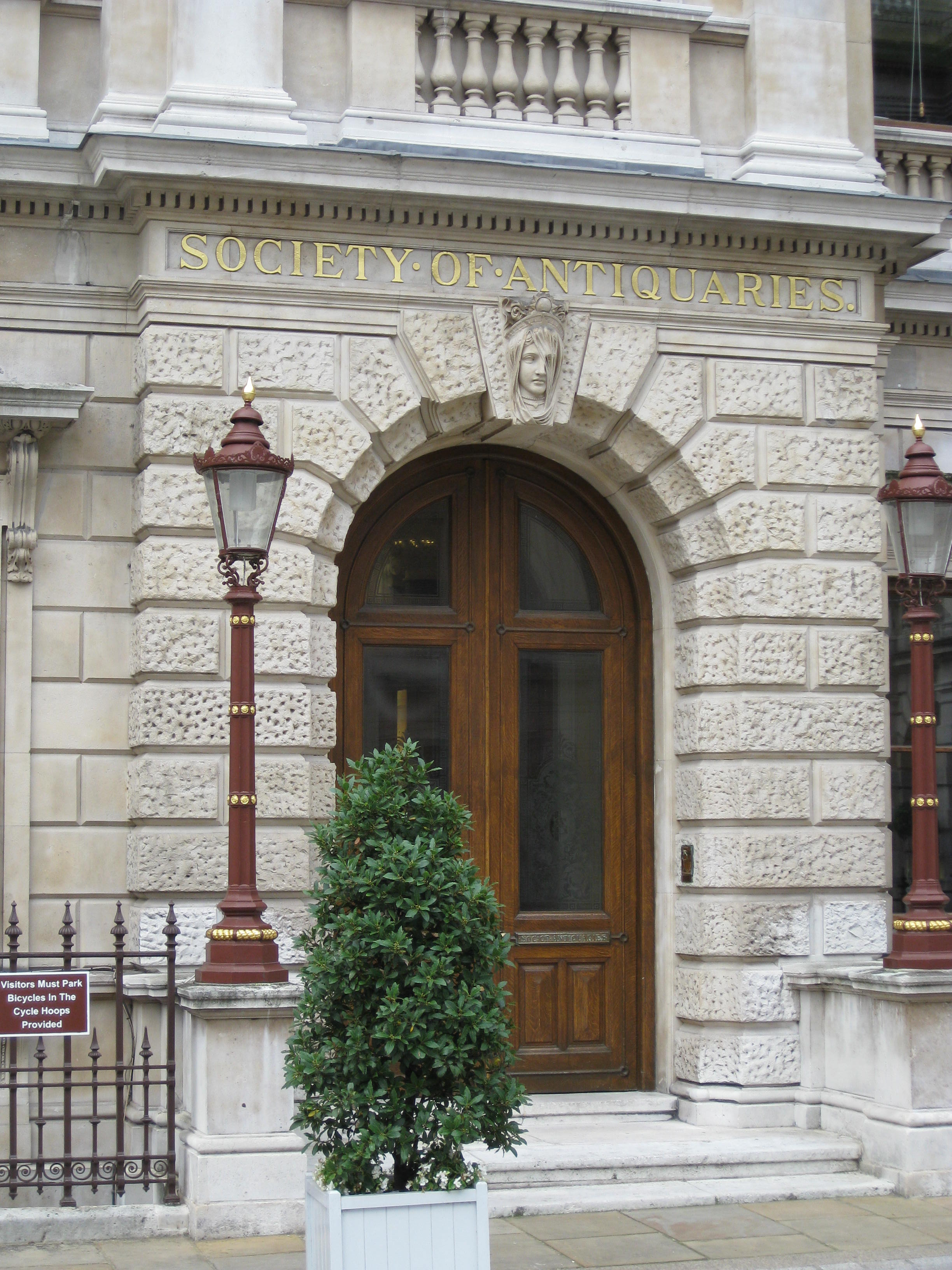
- Entrance from Burlington House courtyard
- Formation: 1707; 319 years ago (royal charter: 1751)
- Type: Learned society
- Registration no.: 207237
- Legal status: Registered charity
- Purpose: Historical and archaeological
- Headquarters: Burlington House, London
- Services: Research and publications, lectures and events, grant-giving, heritage conservation, and exhibitions
- Members: 3,300 (2025)
- President (48th): Martin Millett
- General Secretary: Natasha McEnroe
- Revenue: £2,567,905 (2020)
- Website: www.sal.org.uk

The Society of Antiquaries of London (SAL) is a learned society of historians and archaeologists in the United Kingdom. It was founded in 1707, received its royal charter in 1751 and is a registered charity. It is based at Burlington House in Piccadilly, a building owned by the UK government.

The modern membership of around 3,300 fellows mostly consists of archaeologists and historians, who can use the post-nominal letters FSA after their names.

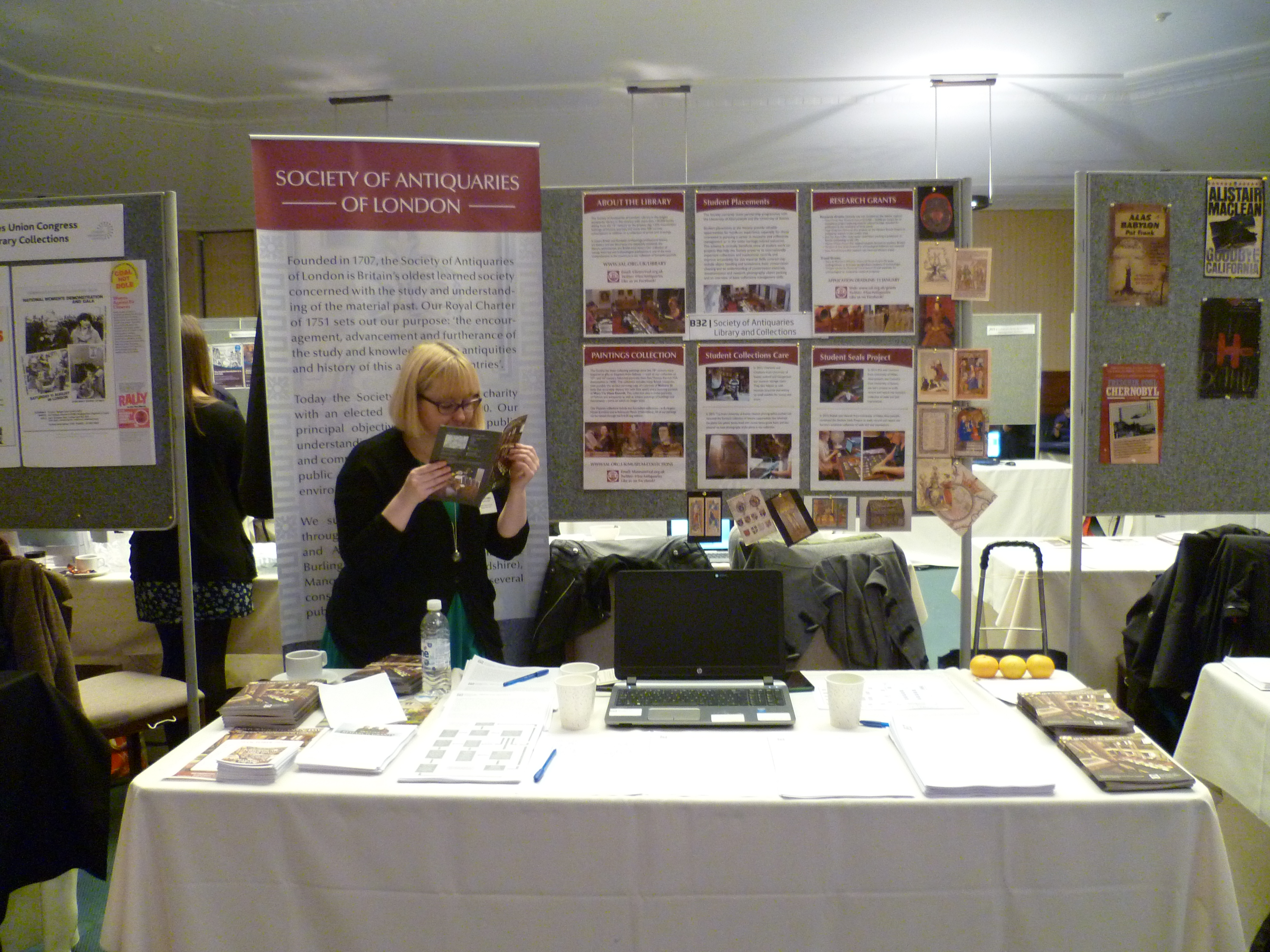
The Society of Antiquaries of London at the University of London History Day, 2016

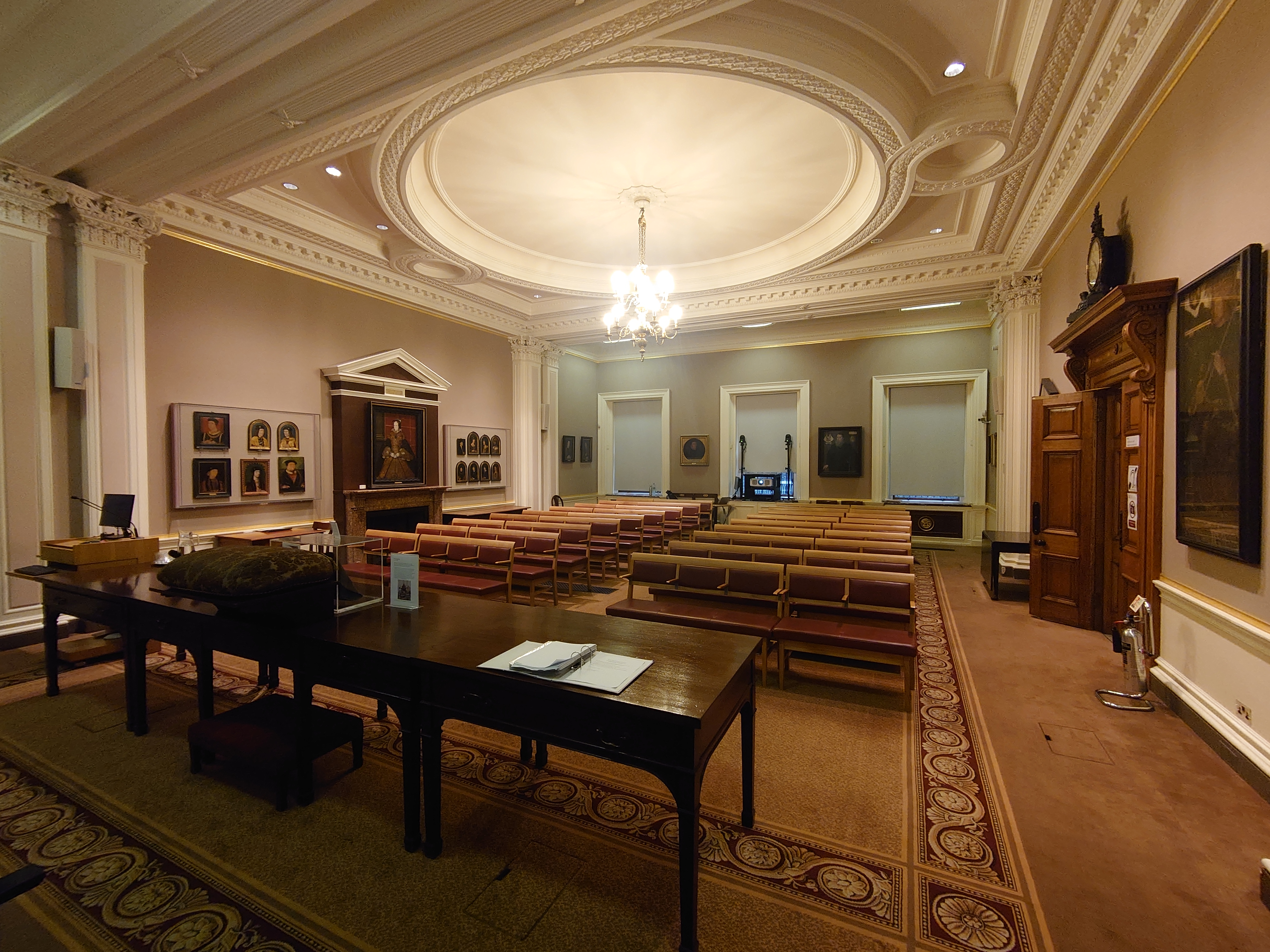
One of the rooms in the west wing used by the Society of Antiquaries

== Membership ==
Fellows (full members) of the society are elected by existing fellows and are entitled to use the post-nominal letters FSA after their names. The election procedure is selective and fellowship is regarded as recognition of significant achievement in the fields of archaeology, antiquities, history or heritage. A nomination must be made by an existing fellow and endorsed by between five and twelve other fellows. A secret ballot of the membership is then held; to be successful a candidate must receive two "yes" votes for every "no" vote.

As of 2025, the society has a membership of around 3,300 fellows.

In June 2022, the society introduced a lower tier of "affiliate membership", open to anyone on payment of an annual subscription. Benefits include access to and borrowing rights from the society's library.

== History and antecedents ==
A precursor organisation, the College of Antiquaries, was founded c. 1586 and functioned largely as a debating society until it was forbidden to do so by King James I in 1614.

The first informal meeting of the modern Society of Antiquaries occurred at the Bear Tavern on The Strand on 5 December 1707. This early group, conceived by John Talman, John Bagford, and Humfrey Wanley, sought a charter from Queen Anne for the study of British antiquities; its projected ventures included a series of 35 books to be issued. The proposal for the society was to be advanced by Robert Harley, 1st Earl of Oxford, but his dismissal from government caused it to become idle. The formalisation of proceedings occurred in 1717, and the first minutes at the Mitre Tavern, Fleet Street, are dated 1 January 1718. The first secretary of the revived society was William Stukeley.

Those attending these early meetings examined objects, gave talks, and discussed theories of historical sites. Reports on the dilapidation of significant buildings were also produced. The society was also concerned with the topics of heraldry, genealogy, and historical documents. In 1751, a successful application for a charter of incorporation was sought by its long-serving vice president Joseph Ayloffe, which allowed the society to own property.

The society began to gather large collections of manuscripts, paintings, and artefacts, housing such gifts and bequests while a proper institution for them did not exist. The acquisition of a large group of important paintings in 1828 preceded the establishment of the National Portrait Gallery by some 30 years. A gift of Thomas Kerrich, which included portraits of Edward IV, Mary Tudor, and two of Richard III, reveal anti-Tudor bias in their later portrayal.

Following the London Blitz, the society organised many of the excavations of Roman and medieval ruins exposed by the bombing of the City, with annual surveys performed every year between 1946 and 1962. Among other finds, they discovered the previously unknown London citadel (Latin: arx) in the northwest corner of the London Wall. The findings were summarised in 1968 by W. F. Grimes.

In 1962, the society became the owner of the house and land of Kelmscott Manor, the former home of William Morris.

In 2007, the society celebrated its tercentennial year (recognising the first, less formal meetings) with an exhibition at the Royal Academy entitled Making History: Antiquaries in Britain 1707–2007. The tercentenary was also marked by two substantial publications: a collection of seventeen scholarly essays on the parallel themes of the history of the society itself and changing interpretations of the material relics of the past over the three centuries of its existence; and the illustrated catalogue of the exhibition, which included fifteen shorter thematic essays by various expert contributors.

The society faced controversy in 2019, when its council was unable to pass a resolution to eject fellow Hubert Chesshyre. In 2015, a trial of the facts had reached the verdict that Chesshyre had committed child sexual abuse offences, leading to a recommendation from the Honours Committee that he be stripped of honours. The council issued a statement saying that it "regrets that a majority of those present [at the vote] did not see fit to support the resolution" and that the incident showed "need to modernise the society's statutes and governance procedures".

In 2020, following comments made by David Starkey on slavery and genocide, the society announced that they were modernising their procedures for dealing with behaviour which runs contrary to their values. Starkey subsequently resigned his fellowship.

== Library ==
The society's library is the major archaeological research library in the UK. Having acquired material since the early 18th century, the Library's present holdings number more than 100,000 books and around 800 currently received periodical titles. The catalogue include rare drawings and manuscripts, such as the inventory of all Henry VIII's possessions at the time of his death.

As the oldest archaeological library in the country, the Library holds a collection of British county histories, a collection of 18th- and 19th-century books on the antiquities of Britain and other countries and a wide-ranging collection of periodical titles (British and foreign) with runs dating back to the early to mid-19th century.

== Publications ==
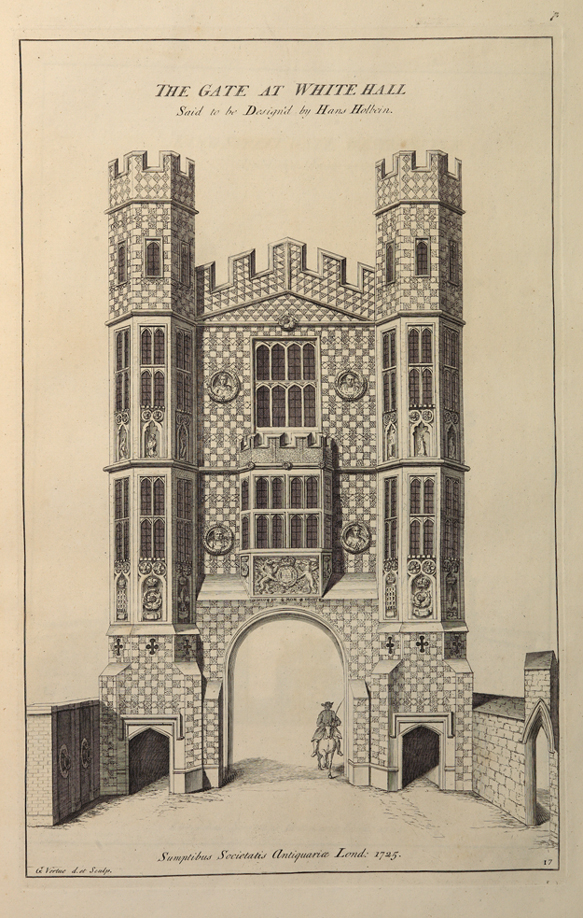
Vertue, 'The Gate at Whitehall' (Holbein Gate) in Vetusta Monumenta Vol.1, 1747 (1826)

=== Vetusta Monumenta ===
In 1718, the society began to publish a series of illustrated papers on ancient buildings, sites, and artefacts, mainly those of Britain and usually written by members of the society, under the title Vetusta Monumenta. The series continued to appear on an irregular basis until 1906. The papers were published in a folio format, and were notable for the inclusion of finely engraved views and reproductions of artefacts.

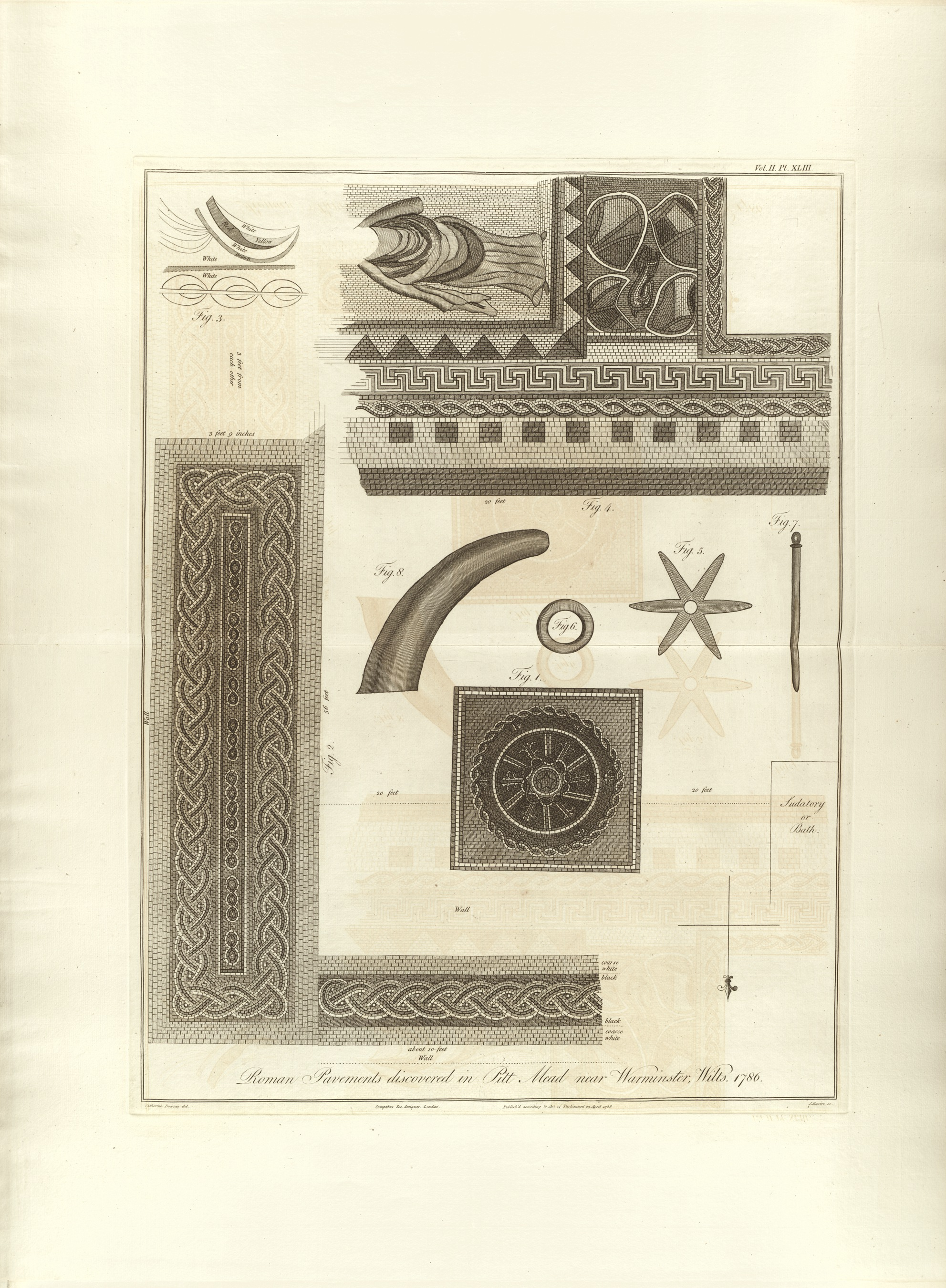
Pit Mead Roman villa mosaic, illustrations by Catherine Downes, engraved by James Basire and presented to the SAL by Daines Barrington

An engraver was employed by the society from its inception – the earliest were George Vertue, James Basire and successors – labouring to produce the copperplate used in the printing of the folio editions. The prints were often large and appealing, and were intended to satisfy popular demand for archæological subject matter; their quasi-scientific illustrations were often inset with multiple viewpoints of architectural details. A fellow of the society, Richard Gough (director 1771 to 1791), sought to expand and improve publication of the society's research, motivated by the steady dilapidation of examples of Gothic architecture.

A later series of oversize issues was used to accommodate the format of some historical works, which the society had commissioned to be reproduced by Edward Edwards and Samuel Hieronymus Grimm in water-colour in 1771; the first issues of these were mostly done by Basire. The first of these with a reproduction of a 16th-century oil painting of the historic scene at the Field of the Cloth of Gold. The paper for this series required a larger size than was available, the manufacturer James Whatman was instructed to create a sheet 31 in × 53 in (790 mm × 1,350 mm); the name given to this format is "Antiquarian". The engraving of the plate, measuring 4 ft 1 in (1.24 m) by 2 ft 3 in (0.69 m), required two years to complete. The standard printing for this series was 400 prints; the plates were carefully stored by the society and used occasionally to fulfil later requests; only three of the seven plates still exist.

=== Archaeologia ===
The society's first journal was Archaeologia (full title: Archaeologia; or, Miscellaneous Tracts relating to Antiquity), of which the first volume appeared, in a quarto format, in 1770. The journal mainly contained papers that had been delivered at the society's meetings: in the early years these included many delivered in previous decades that had remained unpublished. Archaeologia continued to appear on a more or less regular basis until after the Second World War, but then became increasingly irregular, some of its ground having been taken by the society's other journals. Only two volumes were published in the 1980s (vols 107 and 108), and two in the 1990s (vols 109 and 110, published in 1991 and 1992 respectively). The society's tercentennial collection of essays of 2007 was technically published as vol. 111 of Archaeologia. No print volumes have been published since.

In January 2023, Archaeologia was relaunched as an occasional digital journal, to serve as a vehicle for open access research papers of a length falling above the upper limit of c.10,000 words for the Antiquaries Journal.

=== Proceedings and Antiquaries Journal ===
In 1843 the society took the decision to publish some of its proceedings in a second periodical in a smaller format, initially unillustrated, which could appear on a more frequent basis than Archaeologia: it was entitled Proceedings of the Society of Antiquaries of London. The first part appeared in 1844 (containing papers delivered in 1843), and this first series continued until 1859, by which time four volumes had appeared. A second series was then begun, in which 32 volumes appeared down to 1920.

In 1921 Proceedings was superseded by a new annual journal, the Antiquaries Journal. This continues to the present day, volume 101 having been published in 2021.

=== Salon ===
Since the end of 2001, the society has published a fortnightly online newsletter called Salon (Society of Antiquaries Online Newsletter).

== Officers ==
=== Presidents ===
The following have served as Presidents of the Society:

- 1717–24 Peter Le Neve (Norroy King of Arms)
- 1724–50 Algernon, Earl of Hertford
- 1750 Charles, Duke of Richmond
- 1750–54 Martin Folkes
- 1754–65 Hugh, Lord Willoughby of Parham
- 1765–68 Charles Lyttelton, Bishop of Carlisle
- 1768–84 Jeremiah Milles (Dean of Exeter)
- 1784–85 Edward King
- 1785–1811 George, Earl of Leicester
- 1811–12 Sir Henry Englefield
- 1812–46 George, 4th Earl of Aberdeen
- 1846–75 Philip, Viscount Mahon
- 1876–78 Frederic Ouvry
- 1878–85 Henry, 4th Earl of Carnarvon
- 1885–92 Sir John Evans
- 1892–97 Sir Augustus Wollaston Franks
- 1897–1904 Harold, Viscount Dillon
- 1904–08 John, Lord Avebury
- 1908–14 Sir Charles Hercules Read
- 1914–19 Sir Arthur Evans
- 1919–24 Sir Charles Hercules Read
- 1924–29 David, 27th Earl of Crawford
- 1929–34 Sir Charles Reed Peers
- 1934–39 Sir Frederic Kenyon
- 1939–44 Sir Alfred Clapham
- 1944–49 Sir Cyril Fox
- 1949–54 Sir James Mann
- 1954–59 Sir Mortimer Wheeler
- 1959–64 Dame Joan Evans
- 1964–65 Sir Ian Richmond
- 1965–70 Francis Wormald
- 1970–75 J. N. L. Myres
- 1975–78 Arnold Taylor
- 1978–81 Richard Dufty
- 1981–84 Christopher Brooke
- 1984–87 John Davies Evans
- 1987–91 Michael Robbins
- 1991–95 Sir Barry Cunliffe
- 1995–2001 Simon Jervis
- 2001–04 Rosemary Cramp
- 2004–07 Eric Fernie
- 2007–10 Geoffrey Wainwright
- 2010–14 Maurice Howard
- 2014–18 Gill Andrews
- 2018–21 Paul Drury, IHBC FSA
- 2021–present Martin Millett

== See also ==
- Frend Medal
- Kelmscott Manor
- List of antiquarian societies
