= List of islands in the Arctic Ocean =

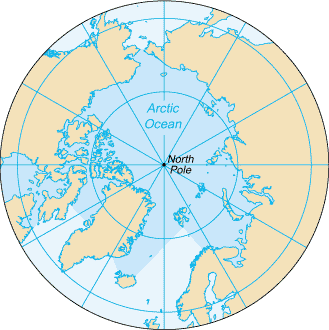
The Arctic Ocean, with borders as delineated by the International Hydrographic Organization (IHO), including Hudson Bay (some of which is south of 57°N latitude, off the map) and all other marginal seas.

These islands of the Arctic Ocean can be classified by the country that controls the territory.

== Canada ==
As of 2026, there are 20 islands in the Canadian Arctic over 5,000 km^{2} (1,900 sq mi). They are listed in order of descending area below. There are a further 19 islands greater than 1,000 km (620 mi) but under 5,000 km^{2} (1,900 sq mi) in Arctic Canada. (Note: All areas from the United States Geological Survey, Esri, and the United Nations Environment Programme - World Conservation Monitoring Centre unless indicated otherwise) As of 2021 the total population of all islands in the Arctic was 23,073.

Rank	Canada rank	World rank	Name (group)	Area (2026)		Territory	Pop (2021)	Notes	Ref	Coordinates
Rank	Canada rank	World rank	Name (group)	(km^{2})	(sq mi)	Territory	Pop (2021)	Notes	Ref	Coordinates
1	1	5	Baffin Island	507,204.95	195,832.93	NU	13,039	Largest in Canada, second in North America, and fifth in the world. Population does not include Kinngait (1,396) and Qikiqtarjuaq (593). Both of which do not lie on Baffin Island proper		68°N 70°W
2	2	8	Victoria Island	219,191.31	84,630.24	NT, NU	2,168	Contains the world's largest island within an island within an island.		70°25′N 107°45′W
3	3	10	Ellesmere Island (Queen Elizabeth Islands)	197,790.33	76,367.27	NU	144	Canada's northernmost island. Population includes Grise Fiord, Alert and Eureka.		79°50′N 78°00′W
4	5	24	Banks Island	70,191.02	27,100.90	NT	104	Robert McClure's ship, the HMS Investigator was found at Mercy Bay in 2010. The ship had been lost during the McClure Arctic expedition. The summer home to hundreds of thousands of migratory birds who nest at Banks Island Migratory Bird Sanctuary No. 1 and Banks Island Migratory Bird Sanctuary No. 2.		72°45′02″N 121°30′10″W
5	6	27	Devon Island (Queen Elizabeth Islands)	55,535.39	21,442.33	NU	0	The largest uninhabited island in the world		75°15′N 088°00′W
6	7	32	Southampton Island	43,069.35	16,629.17	NU	1,035	The only area in Nunavut, that does not use daylight saving time.		64°20′N 084°40′W
7	8	33	Melville Island (Queen Elizabeth Islands)	42,330.26	16,343.80	NT, NU	0	One of two major breeding grounds for the brant geese. DNA analysis and field observations suggest that these birds may be distinct from other brant stocks. The most northerly report of a grizzly bear sighting occurred here in 2003.		75°30′02″N 111°30′09″W
8	9	34	Axel Heiberg Island (Queen Elizabeth Islands)	42,276.97	16,323.23	NU	0	Location of the McGill Arctic Research Station that was established in 1960. Known for its unusual fossil forests, which date from the Eocene period.		79°45′N 091°00′W
9	10	40	Prince of Wales Island	33,307.98	12,860.28	NU	0	The CBC series North of North is set in the fictional town of Ice Cove, which is situated on the island.		72°40′N 99°00′W
10	12	46	Somerset Island	24,754.51	9,557.77	NU	0	Site of Fort Ross, Nunavut, last trading post established by the Hudson's Bay Company.		73°15′N 93°30′W
11	13	54	Bathurst Island (Queen Elizabeth Islands)	16,050.61	6,197.18	NU	0	Site of Brooman Point Village, a Dorset, Paleo-Eskimo and Thule village, and Qausuittuq National Park, and the Nanuit Itillinga National Wildlife Area.		75°45′N 100°00′W
12	14	55	Prince Patrick Island (Queen Elizabeth Islands)	15,792.19	6,097.40	NT, NU	0	Home of the now abandoned Mould Bay Weather Station, part of the Joint Arctic Weather Station system between Canada and the United States opened in 1948. (Note: Listed as Elleg Ringens)		76°45′02″N 119°30′12″W
13	15	59	King William Island	13,174.63	5,086.75	NU	1,349	Sir John Franklin’s two ships, HMS Erebus and HMS Terror, were found in what is now the Wrecks of HMS Erebus and HMS Terror National Historic Site.		69°10′N 97°25′W
14	16	67	Ellef Ringnes Island (Sverdrup Islands; Queen Elizabeth Islands)	11,350.45	4,382.43	NU	0	Isachsen, opened in 1948, formerly staffed weather station, but now an Automated Surface Observing System		78°30′N 102°15′W
15	17	69	Bylot Island	11,057.96	4,269.50	NU	0	Home to Sirmilik National Park and Bylot Island Migratory Bird Sanctuary		73°13′N 78°34′W
16	19	78	Prince Charles Island	9,665.87	3,732.01	NU	0	Inuit visited the island to hunt caribou		67°47′N 76°12′W
17	21	96	Cornwallis Island (Queen Elizabeth Islands)	7,070.11	2,729.78	NU	183	Resolute, the only community, was established in 1953 by forced migration known as the High Arctic relocation.		75°08′N 95°00′W
18	24	106	Coats Island	5,708.64	2,204.12	NU	0	The last home of the Sadlermiut.		62°30′N 083°00′W
19	25	112	Amund Ringnes Island (Sverdrup Islands; Queen Elizabeth Islands)	5,289.51	2,042.29	NU	0			78°20′N 96°25′W
20	26	116	Mackenzie King Island (Queen Elizabeth Islands)	5,056.27	1,952.24	NT, NU	0			78°02′N 109°50′W

Other notable islands in the Canadian portion of the Arctic Ocean include:

- Hans Island (uninhabited 80°49′35″N 66°27′30″W), shared with Denmark, the Danish Realm / Greenland
- Herschel Island (unihabitied 69°35′23″N 139°05′57″W), located in the Beaufort Sea, part of the Yukon but also part of the Inuvialuit Settlement Region

Inhabited islands are:

- Broughton Island (population 593, 67°34′N 063°54′W)
- Dorset Island (population 1,396, 64°12′N 76°32′W)
- Flaherty Island (population 1,010, 56°14′N 079°17′W)
- Igloolik Island (population 2,049, 69°23′N 81°40′W)

== Denmark ==
- Greenland, an autonomous territory in the Danish Realm
  - Clavering Island
  - Disko Island
  - Geographical Society Island
  - Hans Island (shared with Canada)
  - Kaffeklubben Island
  - Milne Land
  - Nares Land
  - Shannon Island
  - Traill Island
  - Ymer Island

== Iceland ==
- Iceland (northern coast)
  - Æðey
  - Drangey
  - Flatey, Skjálfandi
  - Grímsey
  - Hrísey
  - Kolbeinsey
  - Málmey
  - Vigur

== Norway ==
- Bear Island
- Jan Mayen
- Svalbard Archipelago:
  - Barentsøya
    - Alekseevøya
    - Kükenthaløya
  - Edgeøya
    - Halvmåneøya
    - Ryke Yseøyane
    - Thousand Islands
    - Zeiløyane
  - Hopen
  - Kong Karls Land
    - Abel Island
    - Kongsøya
    - Svenskøya
  - Kvitøya (White Island)
  - Nordaustlandet
    - Chermsideøya
    - Foynøya
    - Karl XII-øya
    - Lågøya
    - Nordre Castrénøya and Søre Castrénøya
    - Repøyane
    - Sabine Islands
    - Scoresbyøya
    - Storøya
  - Prins Karls Forland
  - Spitsbergen
    - Amsterdam Island
    - Danes Island
    - Fuglesangen
    - Moffen
    - Nymark
    - Sørkappøya
    - Wilhelm Island
  - Sjuøyane
    - Martensøya
    - Nelsonøya
    - Parryøya
    - Phippsøya
    - Rossøya
    - Tavleøya
    - Vesle Tavleøya
    - Waldenøya
    - Hinnoya

== Russia ==
Russian Arctic islands

- Dikson Island
- Franz Josef Land
  - Bell Island
  - Graham Bell Island
  - Hooker Island
  - Jackson Island
  - Northbrook Island
  - Rudolf Island
  - Wilczek Island
  - Zemlya Aleksandry
  - Zemlya Georga
- Great Diomede Island
- New Siberian Islands
  - Anzhu Islands
    - Belkovsky Island
    - Kotelny/Faddeyevsky Island (including the island of 'Bunge Land')
    - New Siberia
  - Lyakhovsky Islands
    - Great Lyakhovsky Island
    - Little Lyakhovsky Island
  - Semyonovsky Island
  - Stolbovoy Island
- Novaya Zemlya
  - Mezhdusharskiy Island
  - Severny Island
  - Vaygach Island
  - Yuzhny Island
- Severnaya Zemlya
  - October Revolution Island
  - Bolshevik Island
  - Komsomolets Island
  - Pioneer Island
  - Schmidt Island
  - De Long Islands
    - Bennett Island
    - Henrietta Island
    - Jeannette Island
    - Vilkitsky Island
    - Zhokhov Island
  - Minor Islands in Severnaya Zemlya
    - Bolshoy Island
    - Maly Taymyr Island
    - Sedov Archipelago
      - Srednij, Golomyannyj, Domashnij, Figurnyj, Vostochnyj, Smaojlovich
    - Vostothny Island
- Solovetsky Islands
  - Anzersky
  - Bolshaya Muksalma
  - Malaya Muksalma
  - Solovetsky
- Victoria Island (administered as part of Franz Josef Land, but physically separate)
- Ushakov Island (Russian Arctic) halfway between Franz Josef Land and Severnaya Zemlya
  - Wiese Island
- Wrangel Island
  - Herald Island

Five new islands were discovered by Russia in October 2019.

== United States ==
- Barter Island
- Arey Island

== See also ==
- Lists of islands
- List of islands in the Atlantic Ocean
- List of islands in the Pacific Ocean
- List of islands in the Indian Ocean
- List of Antarctic and subantarctic islands
- Extreme points of the Arctic
