= Repøyane =

Islands in Svalbard, Norway

Coordinates: 80.4483°N 24.1742°E

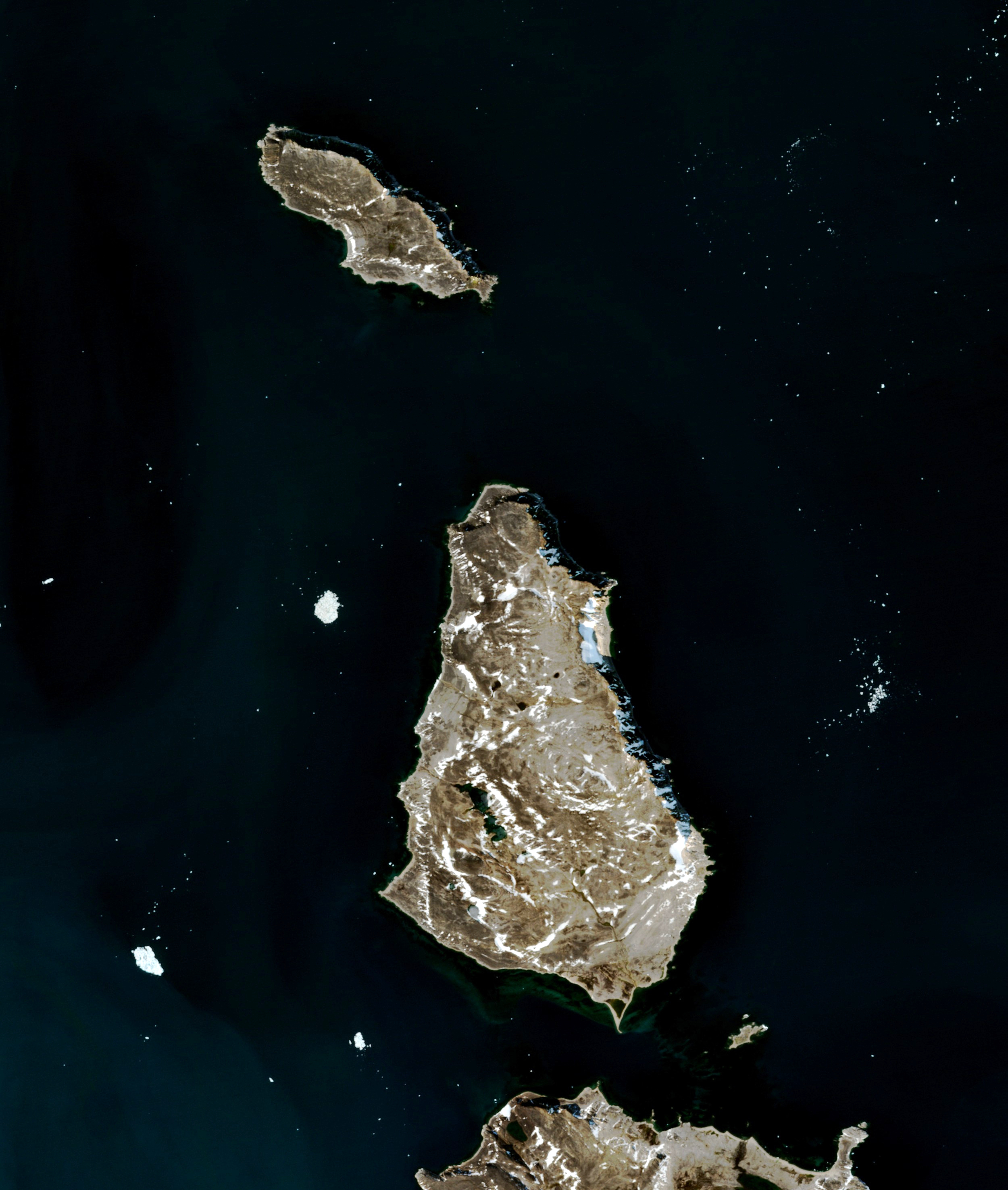
Sentinel-2 image (2020)

Repøyane is the name of two islands off Orvin Land at Nordaustlandet, Svalbard. The two islands, Nordre and Søre Repøya, are located at the northern side of Glenhalvøya, at the mouth of Duvefjorden. The two islands are separated by the Poortsundet sound, and Gilessundet separates Søre Repøya from Glenhalvøya.
