= Straumporten =

Strait in Svalbard, Norway

Coordinates: 80°40′N 20°49.5′E

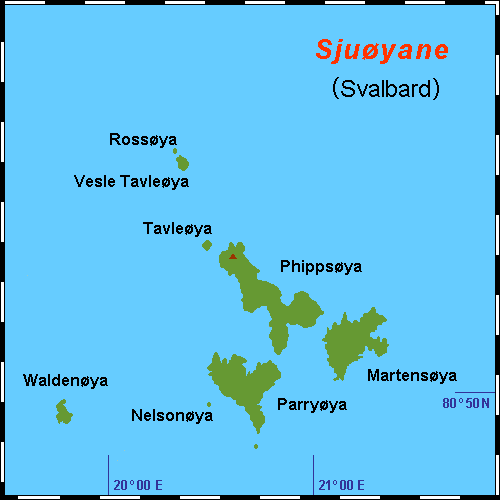
Sjuøyane

Straumporten (English: Stream Gate) is a 1,340 m (4,400 ft)-wide sound between the southernmost part, Migmatittodden of Phippsøya and northeast side, Gullberget of Parryøya, in Sjuøyane north of Nordaustlandet in Svalbard, Norway.

The sound was named because drift ice often passes through it with the tidal streams.
