= Karl XII-øya =

Island north of the island of Nordaustlandet in Svalbard, Norway

Coordinates: 80.66°N 25.00°E

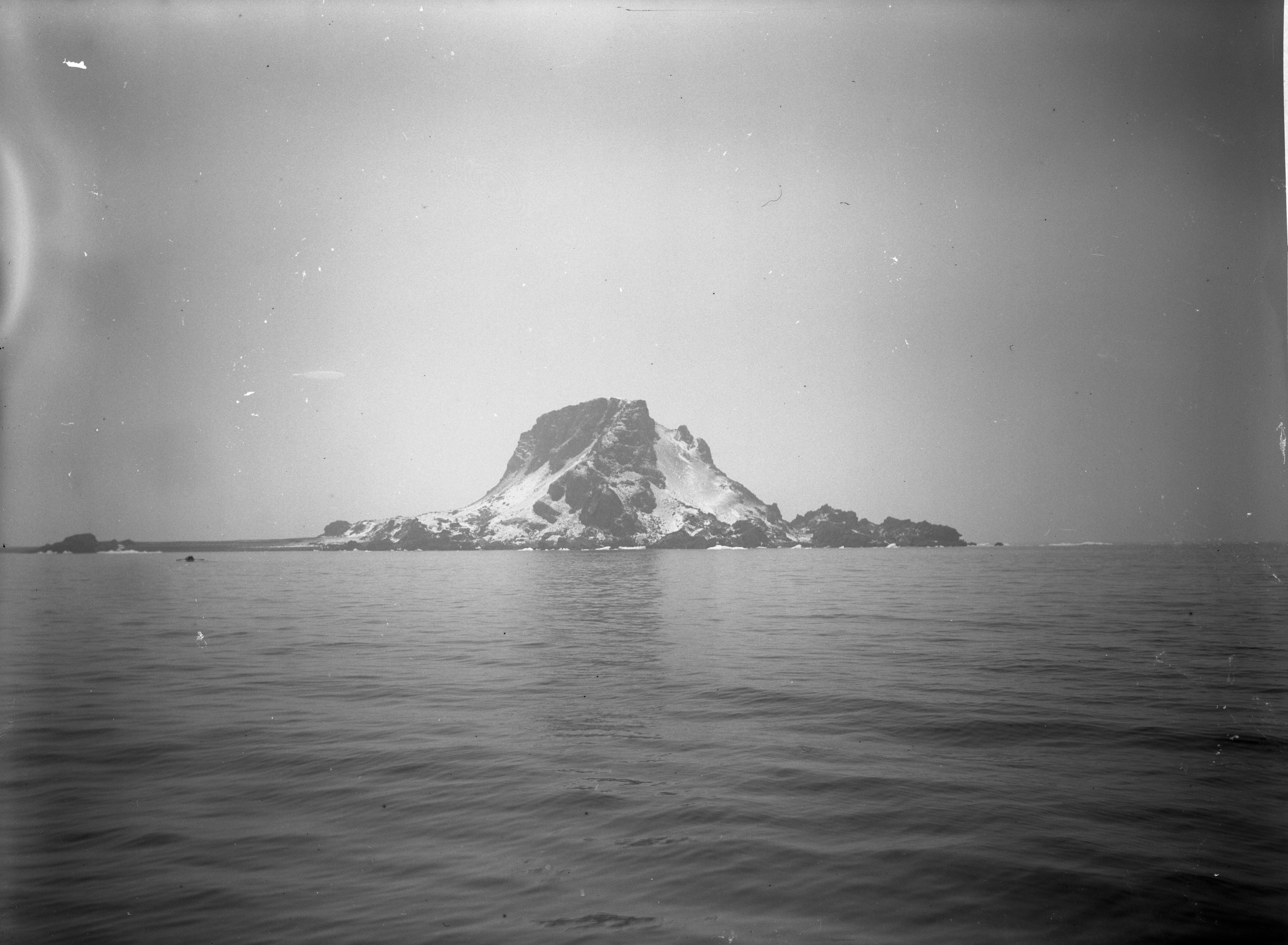
Karl XII-øya photographed by Axel Hamberg during the 1898 Swedish expedition.

Karl XII-øya is located north of the island of Nordaustlandet

Karl XII-øya (English: Carl XII Island) is an island north of the island of Nordaustlandet in Svalbard, Norway. Except for Sjuøyane, Karl XII-øya is the northernmost part of Svalbard, and thus also Norway.

Karl XII-øya is a roughly 2 km long, narrow island situated about 34 km north of Nordaustlandet proper. The 105 meter high Kongsberget in the north and the 30 meter high Drabanten in the south are two of the highest points on the island. The nearest point on Nordaustlandet is Bergstrømodden, but there are two islands, Nordre Repøya and Søre Repøya that are closer to Karl XII-øya. Hence, the distance from Nordre Repøya is about 25 km.

Karl XII-øya is named after Carl XII, 1682–1718, King of Sweden 1697–1718. The island was visited by Adolf Erik Nordenskiöld in 1861. Alfred Gabriel Nathorst and others on board the Antarctic visited the island in 1898. Members of the Swedish-Norwegian expedition to Svalbard also visited in 1931.
