= Alpini Island =

Island in Svalbard, Norway

Native name: Alpiniøya
- Location within Svalbard

Geography
- Coordinates: 80°21′01″N 24°45′02″E

Administration
- Norway

Alpini Island (Norwegian: Alpiniøya) is an island in the Svalbard archipelago, north of Orvin Land in Nordaustlandet. It is located off the headland Bergströmodden, at the mouth of Finn Malmgren Fjord. The island is named after the Italian military corps Alpini, due to a visit to the island in 1928 by an expedition leader and captain of an Alpini regiment, Gennaro Sora.
