= Adlersparrefjorden =

Fjord

Coordinates: 80.3090°N 24.1207°E

Adlersparrefjorden is a fjord of Nordaustlandet, Svalbard, an eastern branch of Duvefjorden at the northern coast. It has a length of about 10 kilometers, and has three branches. A land tongue of 0.5 kilometers separates the fjord from Finn Malmgren Fjord at the eastern side of Glenhalvøya. Adlersparrefjorden is named after naval officer Axel Adlersparre.
