= Nordkappsundet =

Norwegian strait

Coordinates: 80°35.1′N 20°19.0′E

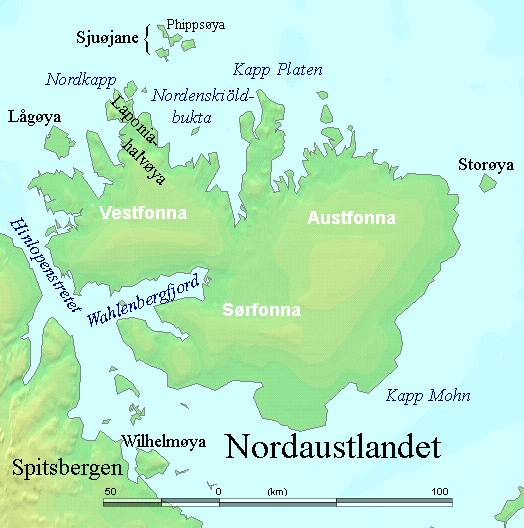
Nordkappsundet is located off the northern part of Nordaustlandet, Svalbard.

Nordkappsundet (English: North Cape Sound or Strait) is a 10-15 km wide strait between Chermsideøya off the north of Nordaustlandet in the south and Sjuøyane in the north, Svalbard in Arctic Norway. Named after Nordkapp (North Cape) on Chermsideøya, the northern extreme of mainland Svalbard.
