= Boydfjellet =

Mountain in Svalbard, Norway

Coordinates: 80.3129°N 24.8314°E

Boydfjellet is a mountain in Orvin Land at Nordaustlandet, Svalbard. It is located at the eastern side of Finn Malmgren Fjord, and has a height of 300 m.a.s.l. The mountain is named after American Arctic explorer Louise Arner Boyd.
