= Extreme points of the Arctic =

This is a list of the extreme points of the Arctic, the points of Arctic lands that are farther to the north than any other location classified by continent and country, latitude and longitude, and distance to the North Pole. The list is sorted from north to south.

Name	Country	Region	Coordinates	Distance from Pole		Northernmost land of
Name	Country	Region	Coordinates	km	mi	Northernmost land of
Kaffeklubben Island, Peary Land	Denmark (Greenland)	North America	83°40′N 29°50′W	707	439	Earth
Cape Morris Jesup, Peary Land	Denmark (Greenland)	North America	83°37′39″N 32°39′52″W	712	442	Greenlandic mainland
Cape Columbia, Ellesmere Island, Nunavut	Canada	North America	83°06′41″N 69°57′12″W	769	478	Canada
Cape Fligely, Rudolf Island, Franz Josef Land, Arkhangelsk Oblast	Russia	Europe	81°50′35″N 59°14′22″E	911	566	Eurasia, including Europe
Arctic Cape, Komsomolets Island, Severnaya Zemlya, Krasnoyarsk Krai	Russia	Asia	81°13′N 95°15′E	981	610	Asia
Rossøya, Sjuøyane, Svalbard archipelago	Norway	Europe	80°49′45″N 20°24′0″E	1,024	636	Western Europe
Cape Chelyuskin, Taymyr Peninsula, Krasnoyarsk Krai	Russia	Asia	77°44′N 104°15′E	1,370	850	any mainland continent
Murchison Promontory, Boothia Peninsula, Nunavut	Canada	North America	71°59′55″N 94°32′45″W	2,014	1,251	mainland North America
Point Barrow, Alaska	United States	North America	71°23′20″N 156°28′45″W	2,078	1,291	United States
Cape Nordkinn, Gamvik Municipality, Finnmark	Norway	Europe	71°08′02″N 27°39′00″E	2,106	1,309	mainland Continental Europe
Nuorgam, Lapland	Finland	Europe	70°05′18″N 27°56′30″E	2,200	1,400	Finland
Three-Country Cairn, Lapland	Sweden	Europe	69°03′35.9″N 20°32′55.1″E	2,325	1,445	Sweden
Grímsey island, Eyjafjörður	Iceland	Europe	66°33′N 18°01′W	2,605	1,619	Iceland

== Highest point ==
- Gunnbjørn Fjeld, (Note: Gunnbjørn Fjeld is the highest point on the Island of Greenland, Kalaallit Nunaat, the Kingdom of Denmark, and the entire Arctic.) Sermersooq, Island of Greenland, Greenland 68°55′10″N 29°53′55″W — highest summit at 3694 m (12,119 feet)

== Lowest point ==
- Arctic Ocean — lowest surface point at sea level
- The deepest point is Litke Deep in the Eurasian Basin, at 5,450 m (17,880 ft).

== See also ==
- Extreme points of Earth
- Extreme points of the Antarctic
