= Bergströmodden =

Headland of Nordaustlandet, Svalbard

Coordinates: 80.3424°N 24.8235°E

Bergströmodden is a headland in Orvin Land at Nordaustlandet, Svalbard. It is located north of the mountain Boydfjellet, at the mouth of Finn Malmgren Fjord, east of Alpini Island. The headland is named after Swedish politician Axel Bergström.
