= Migmatittodden =

Headland of Phippsøya, Svalbard

Coordinates: 80°40′N 20°49.5′E

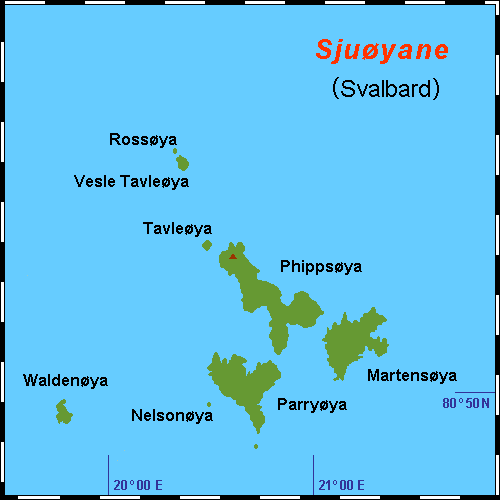
Sjuøyane

Migmatittodden (English: Migmatite Head) is the southern headland of Phippsøya, one of Sjuøyane, north of Nordaustlandet, Svalbard, Norway.
