= Friderich Martens =

17th century German feldsher, explorer, naturalist, and writer

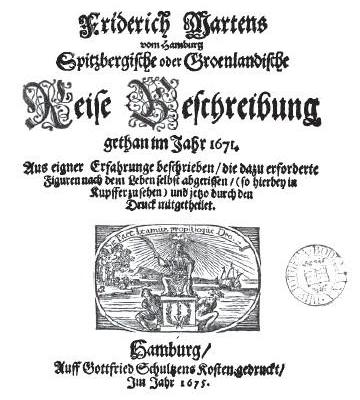
- Front cover of Martens' well-known book
- Born: 1635; Hamburg, Holy Roman Empire
- Died: 1699 (aged 63–64); Hamburg, Holy Roman Empire
- Occupations: Feldsher, naturalist, explorer, writer, expedition medicine
- Known for: First scientific descriptions of Svalbard
- Notable work: Spitzbergische oder Groenlandische Reise-Beschreibung

Friderich Martens (1635–1699) was a German feldsher and naturalist who conducted the first scientific observations of the nature, animal life, and climate of Svalbard. He published his notes in the book "Spitzbergische oder Groenlandische Reise-Beschreibung", translated in English as "Svalbard and Greenland Travelogue." This book became a reference work for many decades.

== Biography ==
Martens was born in Hamburg in 1635 and trained as a feldsher and naval surgeon. In the 17th century, the profession of "surgeon" was distinct from physicians. Surgeons were practical medical practitioners who handled everything from dentistry to amputations. Martens' cultivated ability to observe, identify, and document with high precision, likely honed by his medical training, later proved invaluable for his scientific descriptions of Arctic fauna, flora, and environment in Svalbard.

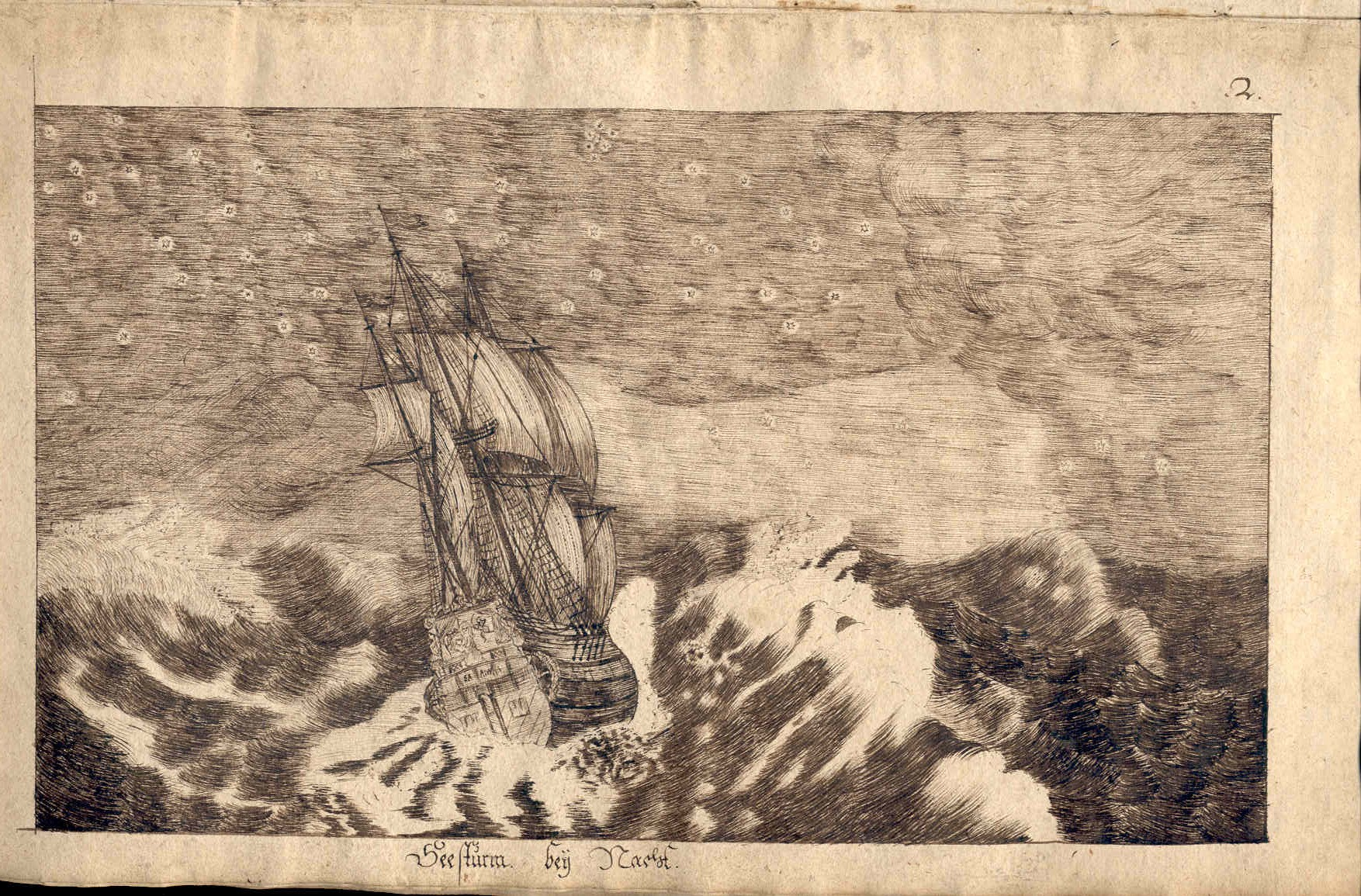
"Sea storm at night." Pen drawing by Martens

=== 1671 Voyage to Svalbard and Greenaland ===
In 1671 Martens joined a voyage on a whaler through the Norwegian Sea to Spitsbergen. The Jonas im Walfisch (Jonah in the Whale), under captain Pieter Pieterszoon van Friesland, left Hamburg on 15 April 1671 heading north. The vessel left Spitsbergen on 22 July again reaching the Elbe on 21 August the same year. While the crew was focused on the lucrative business of whaling and sealing, Martens took it upon himself to document the environment. He recorded detailed descriptions of weather patterns, ice formations, and most notably the flora and fauna.

=== "Svalbard and Greenland Travelogue" written and published ===
Martens compiled the detailed notes of his observations in his book "Spitzbergische oder Groenlandische Reise-Beschreibung, gethan im Jahre 1671" which was published in 1675 by Gottfried Schulzen in Hamburg. The book was revolutionary in that it moved away from the bestiaries of the medieval era and instead focused on empirical observations. Martens was the first to provide accurate descriptions and illustrations of many Arctic plants, such as the scurvy grass and various mosses. He provided the first scientific descriptions of the polar bear, the walrus, and various species of whales and seabirds. He was one of the first to describe the calving of glaciers and the unique crystalline structure of Arctic snowflakes. He documents the first notes on the ivory gull, prior to the descriptions by Constantine Phipps, and the first notes on the Brünnich's guillemot, prior to the descriptions by Morten Brünnich

=== Travel to Spain and Travelogue ===
Martens also wrote a lesser known travelogue about his sea voyage to Spain, which also contained numerous pen-and-ink drawings of landscapes, flora, and fauna. This travelogue to Spain remained unknown for well over 250 years. It was first and only published by Wilhelm Junk in Berlin in 1925 and printed in a small edition, albeit in a smaller format and translated into modern German. This manuscript consists of 62 leaves, 38 of which contain pen drawings, and bound in the waste parchment of a medieval choirbook. The only known copy belonged to the book collection of the Hamburg scholar Johann Peter Kohl, who in 1768 donated it, along with his library, to the Gymnasium Christianeum in Hamburg, where it remains to this day.

=== Later Life ===
Martens returned to Hamburg, where he continued his medical practice. He died in 1699. "Svalbard and Greenland Travelogue" was later translated into several languages and was published in Italian (1680), Dutch (1685), English (1694; as a section of a book) and French (1715; as an article).

== Legacy ==
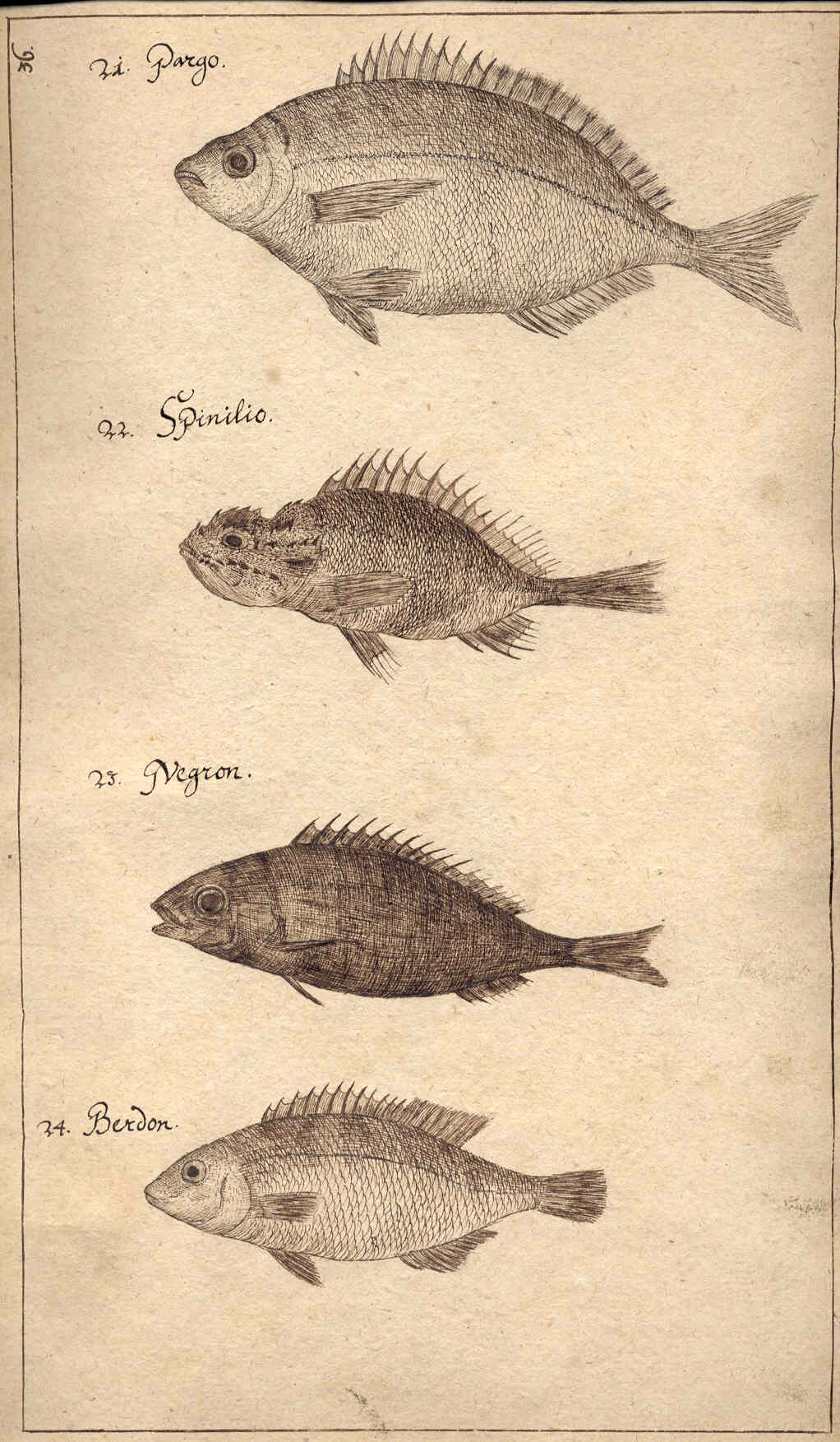
"Of the Fishes That Are Caught in the Bay or Sea near Cadiz and San Lucas" Pen drawing by Martens

"Spitzbergische oder Groenlandische Reise-Beschreibung" remained a reference work for many years and was quoted among others by Constantine Phipps 1774 in "A Voyage towards the North Pole undertaken … 1773", Jacques-Henri Bernardin de Saint-Pierre 1796 in "Études de la nature" and Bernard Germain de Lacépède 1804 in "Histoire naturelle des cétacés".

Carl Linnaeus, the father of modern taxonomy, cited Martens' work when classifying Arctic species.

In 1861 Swedish explorer Adolf Erik Nordenskiöld named Martensøya, an island among the Sjuøyane in honor of Friderich Martens

The National Library of Finland at the University of Helsinki keeps an original copy of a Dutch edition printed in 1710, of which a digital copy is available.

In 2002 a reprint was released in Berlin.

In 2007 El Museo del Fin del Mundo (Ushuaia, Argentina) based on a 1711 copy manuscript kept in its collection, published a Spanish translation of the book.
