= Gilessundet =

Strait in Svalbard, Norway

Coordinates: 80.3640°N 24.2809°E

Gilessundet is a sound that separates Glenhalvøya from Søre Repøya, off Orvin Land at Nordaustlandet, Svalbard. The Gilessundet sound has a width of about one nautical mile. It is named after Dutch navigator Cornelis Giles.
