= Extreme points of Antarctica =

This is a list of extreme points in Antarctica.

== List ==
- Northernmost: Martin-de-Viviès, Île Amsterdam, French Southern and Antarctic Lands, France (37° 48' S)
  - Without subantarctic islands, the northernmost point of political Antarctica is Coronation Island, British Antarctic Territory and Argentine Antarctica (60° 37' S)
  - Without offshore islands, the northernmost point of mainland Antarctica is Prime Head, British Antarctic Territory, Argentine Antarctica, and Chilean Antarctic Territory (63° 12' S)
- Southernmost: South Pole, Antarctica (90° S)
- Westernmost: Anti-Meridian Line, Ross Dependency (180° W)
- Easternmost: Anti-Meridian Line, Ross Dependency (180° E)
- The tallest mountain in Antarctica is Mount Vinson rising 4,892 meters (16,050 feet) above sea level.
- The lowest point in Antarctica is within the Denman Glacier, which reaches 3.5 kilometers (11,500 feet) below sea level. This is also the lowest place on Earth not covered by ocean (although it is covered by ice).
- The lowest accessible point in Antarctica is the shore of Deep Lake, Vestfold Hills, which is 50.4 m beneath sea level.
- The point on land farthest from any coastline on the Antarctic Continent is located at 83.904°S 64.890°E. This is also known as the South Pole of inaccessibility.
- Antarctica is the southernmost land mass on Earth. The Geographical South Pole lies on the Polar Plateau at 90°00′S 00°00′W. It is here that the southernmost human habitation on Earth is located: Amundsen–Scott South Pole Station (U.S. Administered Base).
- Vostok Station is the most isolated research base on the continent (located at 77°S 105°E), and it is situated over the southernmost lake in the world, Lake Vostok, a subglacial lake 4,000 metres (13,000 feet) under the surface of the ice where the station sits. Formerly administered by the Soviets, it is now operated by Russia.
- The southernmost volcano on the planet—Mount Erebus—is in Antarctica on the world's southernmost island reachable from the sea: Ross Island.
- The southernmost island is said to be Berkner Island. It is embedded in the ice shelf, fully covered by ice and fully below sea level, and therefore not an island, but an ice rise. The southernmost true island is probably Black Island (Ross Archipelago).
- The Ross Sea is the southernmost sea in the world, with its southernmost extremity (Amundsen Coast) at the foot of the Horlick Mountains approximately 300 km (200 mi) from the Geographic South Pole. However, this area is covered by the Ross Ice Shelf. The southernmost open sea is also part of Ross Sea, namely Bay of Whales at 78°30'S, at the edge of Ross Ice Shelf.
- The northernmost extremity of the Antarctic mainland (without nearshore islands) is Prime Head, at the northern tip of the Trinity Peninsula at 63°12′48″S 57°18′08″W. The Antarctic Peninsula is the largest contiguous part of the continent projecting north of the Antarctic Circle and thus has many of the continent's research bases. Prime Head is 980 km (610 mi) from Cape Horn. The northernmost research base on the mainland is Esperanza Base.

== Other extremes ==
- While animal life such as penguins and seals are found all around the Antarctic coastline, the continent's only flowering plants are found on the northern portion of the Antarctic Peninsula (see Antarctic flora).
- Highest temperature so far recorded in Antarctica: 19.8 °C (67.6 °F) at Vanda Station (New Zealand administered station) on 5 January 1974.
- Lowest temperature so far recorded in Antarctica: −93.2 °C (−135.8 °F) in the interior of the Antarctica in August 2010. The record temperature was found by scientists sifting through decades of climate data taken by Earth-orbiting satellites. However, the previous record was −89.2 °C (−128.6 °F) at Vostok (Russian administered station) on 21 July 1983 and it is to this day more widely known.
- The highest non-cyclonic winds ever recorded on the Continent were at Commonwealth Bay (66°54′S 142°40′E), which is about 48 kilometres (30 mi) wide and located at the entrance between Point Alden and Cape Gray. Winds regularly exceed 200 km/h here. The fastest wind ever recorded was in the base Belgrano II at 351 km/h (218 mph).
- Antarctica has the world's lowest rainfall average (zero at the Geographic South Pole) and thus is the world's driest continent.
- Despite its low rainfall average, Antarctica has approximately 70% of the world's fresh water (as well as 90% of the world's ice).

== See also ==
- Extreme points of the Arctic
- Farthest South
