= Parryøya =

Island northeast of Nordaustlandet, Svalbard

Coordinates: 80°38.5′N 20°40′E

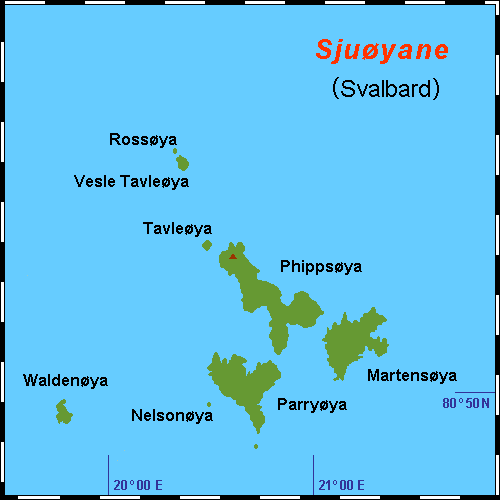
Sjuøyane

Parryøya (English: Parry Island) is southernmost of the three larger islands in Sjuøyane, situated 15 km northeast of Nordaustlandet, Svalbard. Parryøya is separated from Phippsøya to the north by the 1.3 km wide Straumporten sound and from Chermsideøya to the south by Nordkappsundet. Some five or more skerries south of the island's southern tip Fòreneset are named Fòrenesholmane, and two skerries east of the island are named Skrikholmane (English: Shout Skerries). The islands total area ca. 20 km^{2}.. Highest point Øykollen ca. 400 m.a.s.l.. Area covered with ice: ca. 3%, approximately 0,6 km^{2}. (numbers from 1990).

The island was named after the English explorer William Edward Parry, who visited Spitsbergen during his 1827 expedition to reach the North Pole.
