= Phippsøya =

Island north of Nordaustlandet, Svalbard in Arctic Norway

Coordinates: 80°43′N 20°47′E

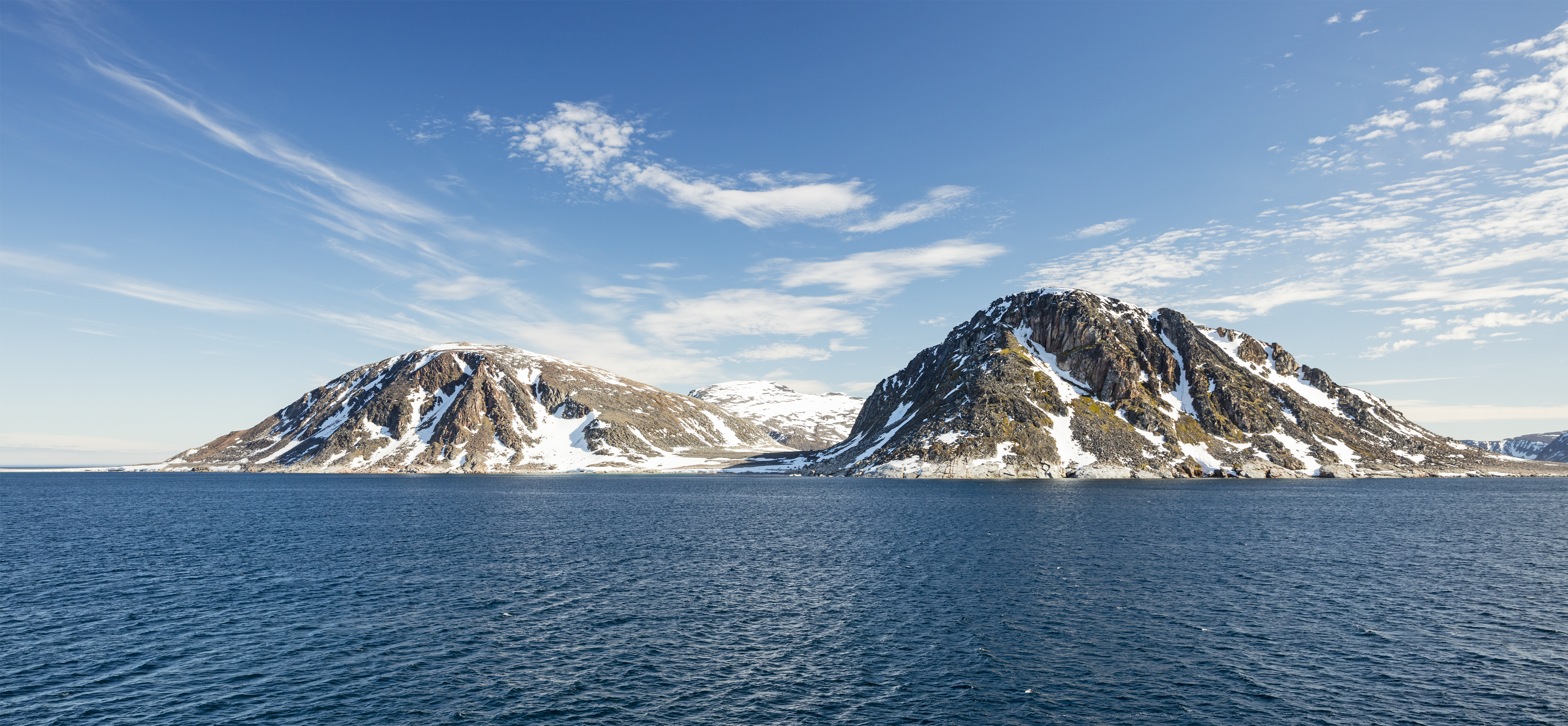
View of Phippsøya from the Straumporten sound (2016)

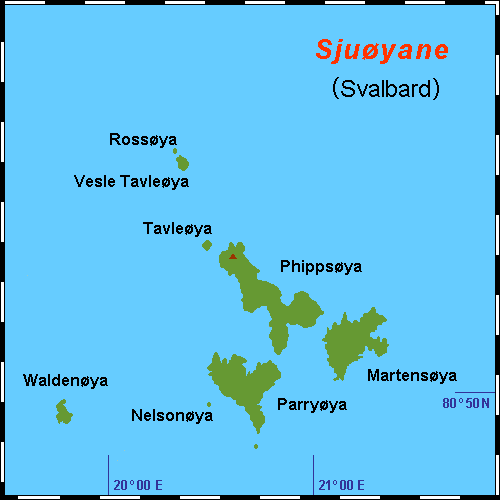
Sjuøyane

Phippsøya (anglicized as Phipps Island) is the largest island in Sjuøyane, an archipelago north of Nordaustlandet, Svalbard in Arctic Norway. It is some 22 km north of Nordkapp on Svalbard proper and 8.5 km south of Rossøya, the northernmost island of the Svalbard archipelago. Phippsøya is separated from Parryøya to the south by the 1.3 km wide Straumporten sound, from Martensøya to the southeast by the 1.1 km wide Trollsundet and from Tavleøya to the northwest by the 1 km wide Marmorsundet.

The island is named after the English explorer Constantine John Phipps, who commanded two bomb vessels, HMS Racehorse and HMS Carcass, on an expedition to Svalbard in 1773.
