= Chermsideøya =

Island north of Nordaustlandet, Svalbard

Coordinates: 80.505°N 19.973°E

Chermsideøya (English: Chermside Island) is a 14 km² island north of Nordaustlandet, Svalbard. It is separated from Nordaustlandet by the 1–2 km wide Beverlysundet. Two km to the east lie the two smaller Castrénøyane (Nordre Castenøya and Søre Castenøya).

Nordkapp (North Cape) on the northern coast is considered the northernmost tip of Svalbard proper, although both Sjuøyane and Karl XII-øya are situated further to the north. Parryøya in Sjuøyane lies some 15 km to the northeast, separated by Nordkappsundet strait.

The island's two highest peaks are Knoll (280 m) on the southwestern half and Tott (230 m) on the northeastern half, named after the cartoon characters The Katzenjammer Kids, which in Norwegian is named Knoll and Tott. The two mountains are divided by Chermsidedalen (Chermside Valley). Area covered with ice: ca. 5 % of total area, approximately 0,7 km^{2}. (numbers from 1990).

The island is named after Herbert Chermside, 1850–1929, later lieutenant-General Sir Herbert Chermside, Governor of Queensland, Australia (1901–07). As lieutenant Chermside, R. E., he accompanied Mr. Leigh Smith on his voyage to Spitsbergen in 1873.
