= Poortsundet =

Coordinates: 80.4522°N 24.1714°E

Poortsundet is a sound that separates Nordre Repøya from Søre Repøya, off Orvin Land at Nordaustlandet, Svalbard. The Poortsundet sound has a width of about 1.4 nautical miles. It is named after the Arctic explorer William Poort.
