= Nordre Repøya =

Island of the two Repøyane, off Orvin Land at Nordaustlandet, Svalbard

Coordinates: 80.4768°N 24.1031°E

Nordre Repøya is the northern island of the two Repøyane, off Orvin Land at Nordaustlandet, Svalbard. The island rises to a height of 230 m.a.s.l. It is separated from Søre Repøya by the sound Poortsundet. The island is named after Dutch whaler and map publisher Outger Rep van Oostzaan.
