= Tavleøya =

Island in Svalbard, Norway

Coordinates: 80°45.2′N 20°27′E

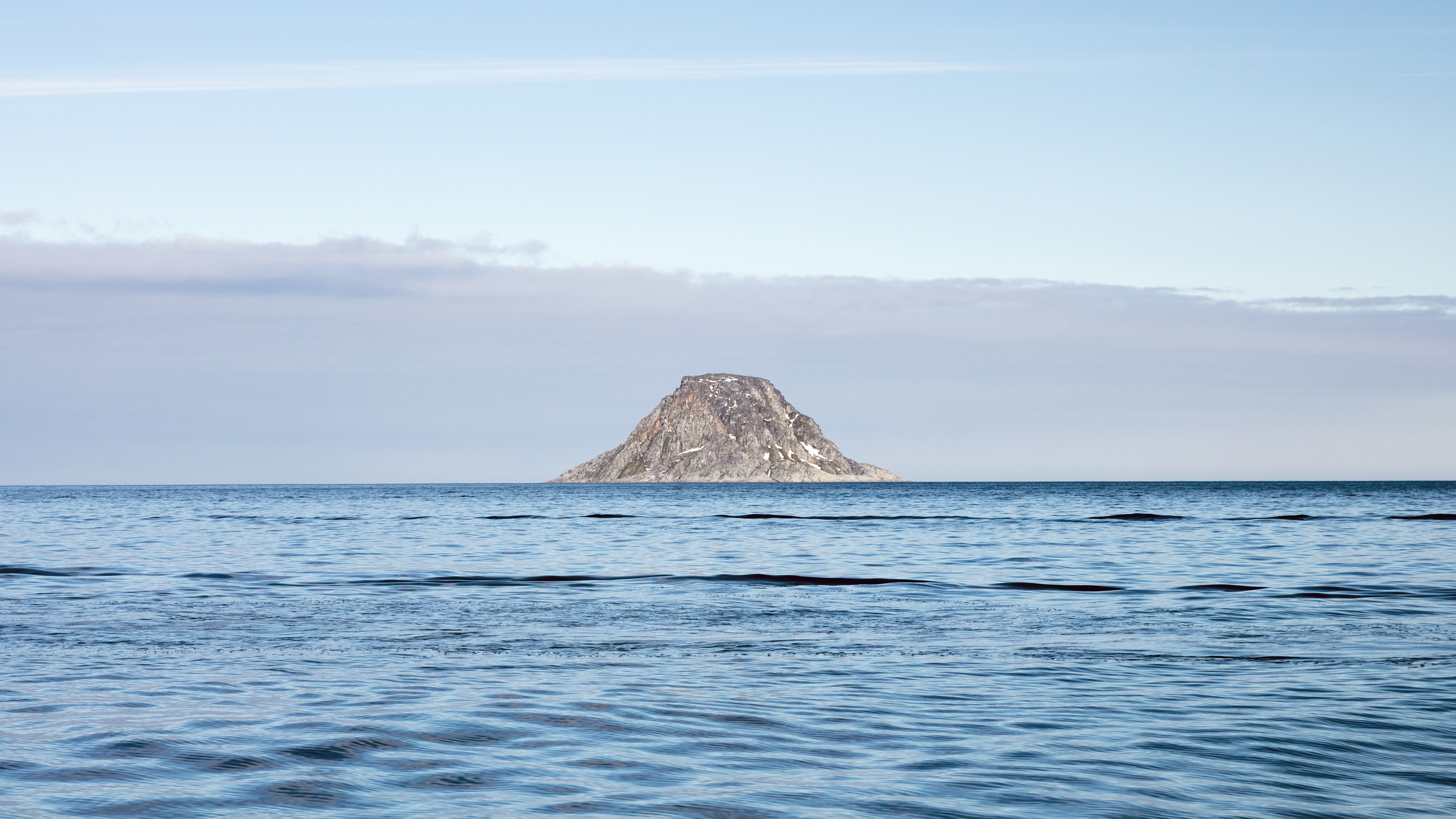
Tavleøya

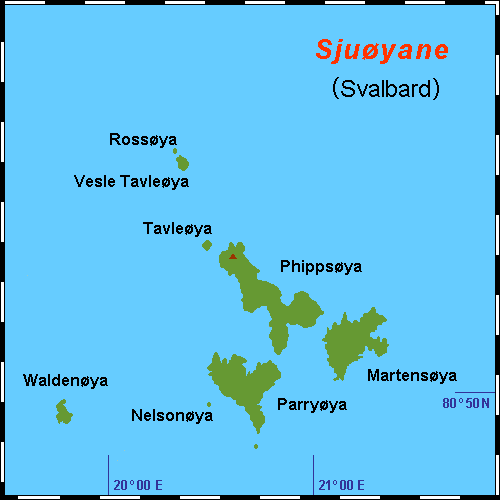
Sjuøyane

Tavleøya (English: Slate Island) is one of Sjuøyane, north of Nordaustlandet. The island lies about 1 km west of the northern point of Phippsøya, separated by Marmorsundet (English: The Marble Sound), and about 7 km south of Vesle Tavleøya. Two smaller skerries to the northwest of Tavleøya are named Kluftholmen.
