= Glenhalvøya =

Peninsula

Coordinates: 80.3273°N 24.3923°E

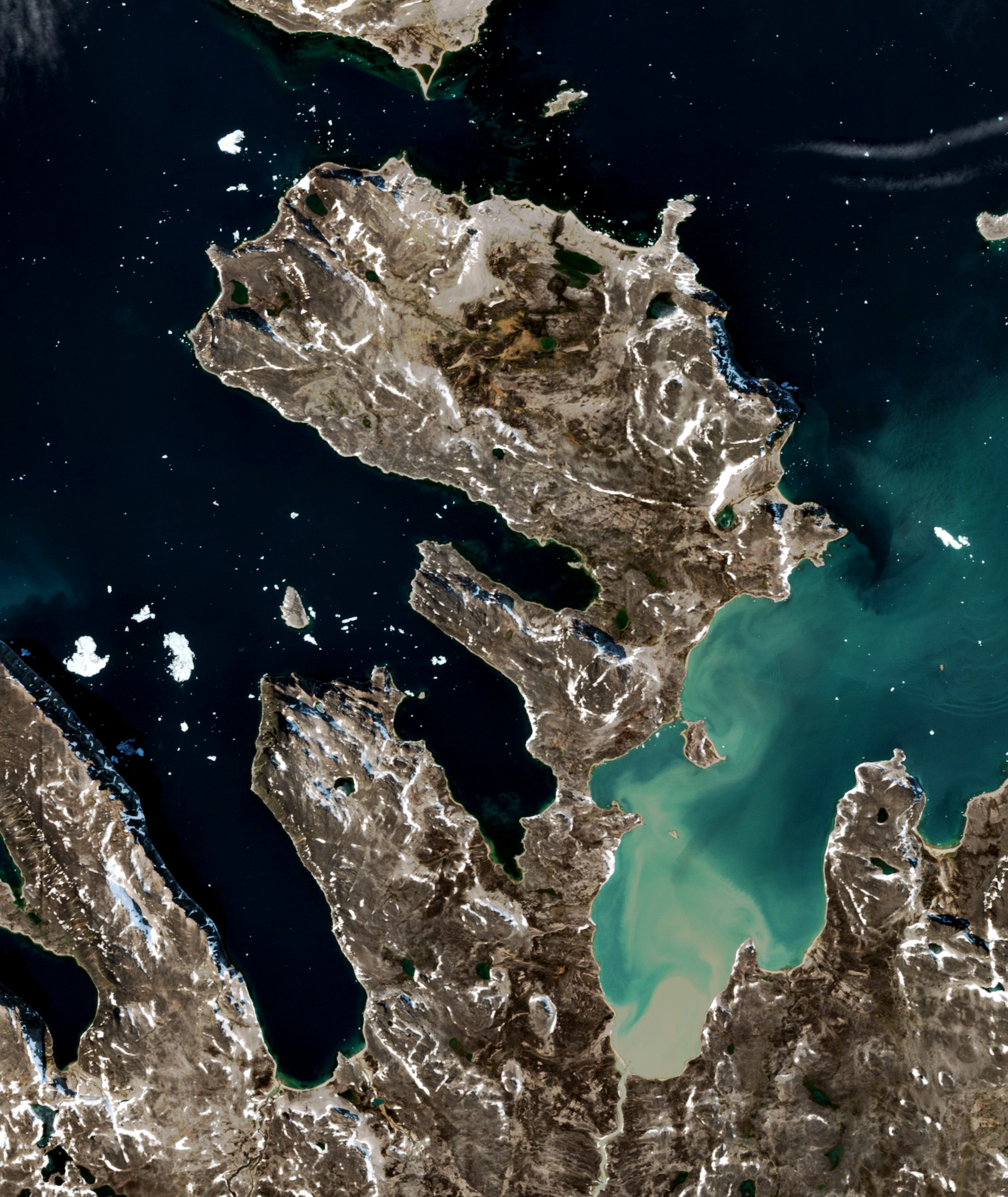
Sentinel-2 image (2020)

Glenhalvøya is a peninsula in Orvin Land at Nordaustlandet, Svalbard, between Finn Malmgren Fjord and Duvefjorden. It is named after Arctic explorer Alexander Richard Glen. The island of Søre Repøya is separated from the peninsula by the strait of Gilessundet.
