= Waldenøya =

Island in Svalbard, Norway

Coordinates: 80°30′N 19°30′E

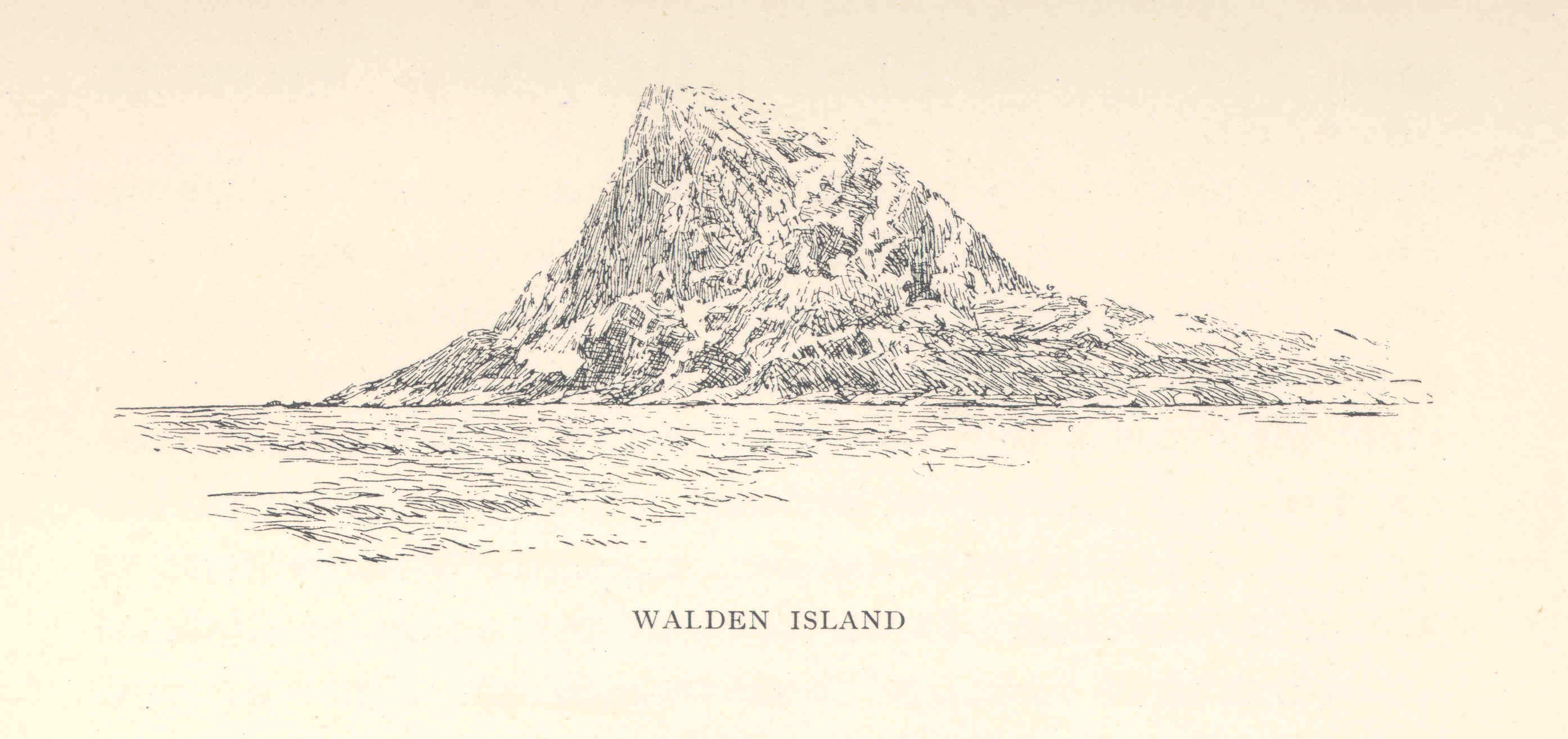
1897 sketch of Waldenoya

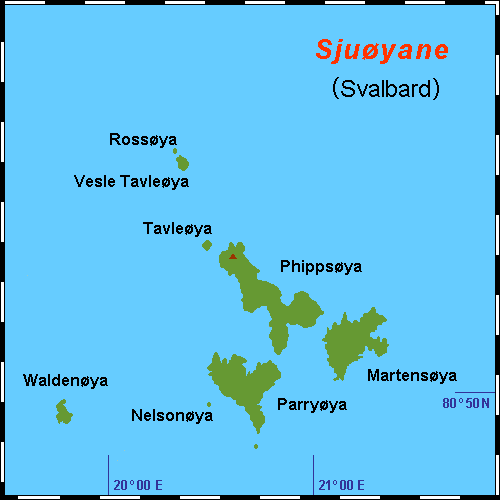
Sjuøyane

Waldenøya (anglicized as Walden Island) is a small, rocky island just north of Nordkapp in Nordaustlandet in the Norwegian territory of Svalbard. It is the westernmost part of Sjuøyane in the Svalbard archipelago.

The island is named after John Walden, who was a midshipman aboard the Hon. Constantine John Phipps' HMS Racehorse in 1773. Walden, along with two pilots, visited the island on August 5 of the same year during the 1773 Phipps expedition towards the North Pole.
