= Søre Repøya =

Island in Svalbard, Norway

Coordinates: 80.4034°N 24.2618°E

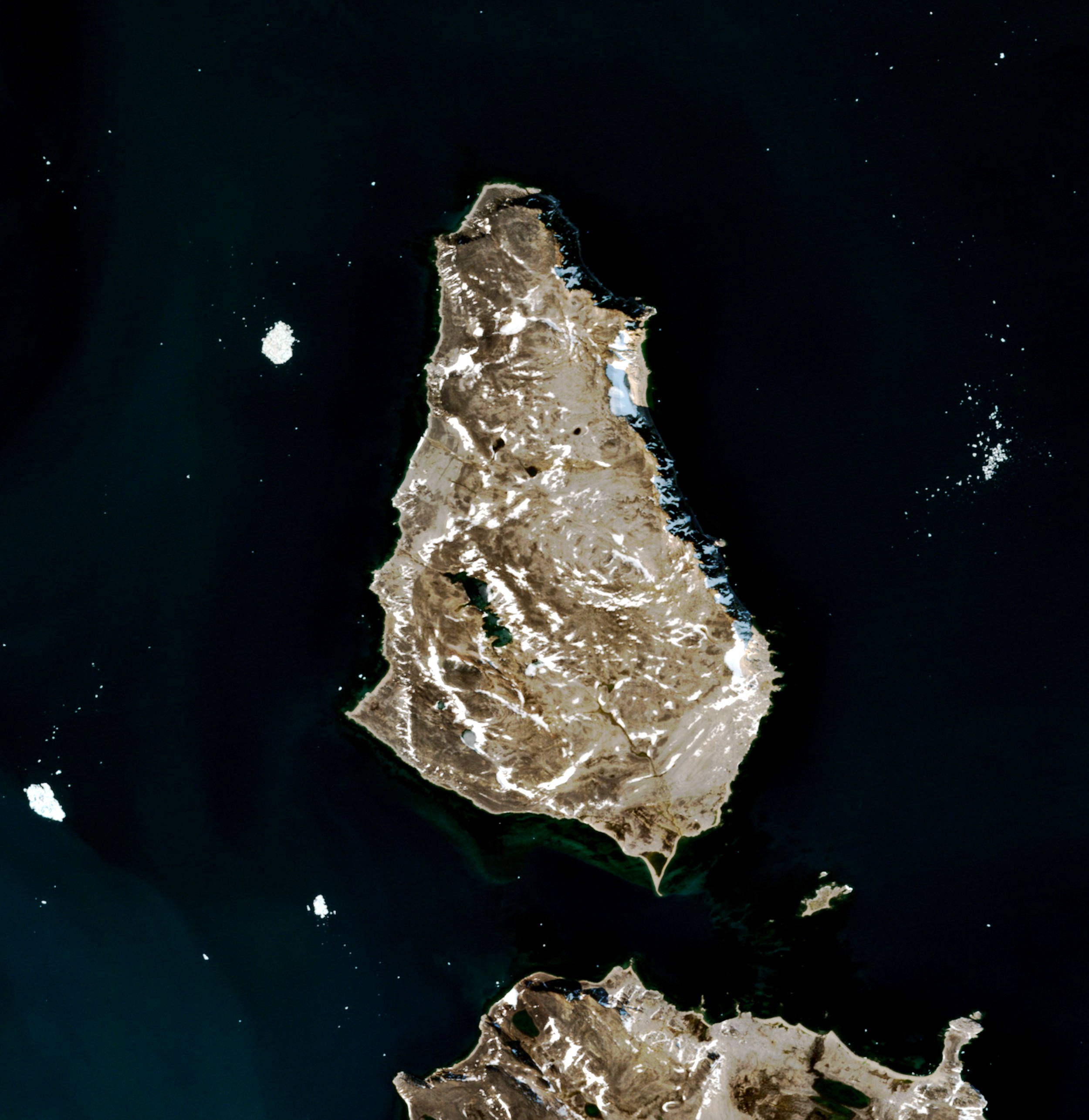
Sentinel-2 image (2020)

Søre Repøya is the largest and southern island of the two Repøyane, off Orvin Land at Nordaustlandet, Svalbard. The island rises to a plateau of up to 240 m.a.s.l. It is separated from Glenhalvøya by the sound Gilessundet, and from Nordre Repøya by the sound Poortsundet. The island is named after Dutch whaler Outger Rep van Ootzaan.
