= Finn Malmgren Fjord =

Fjord in Svalbard, Norway

- Finn Malmgrenfjorden (Norwegian)
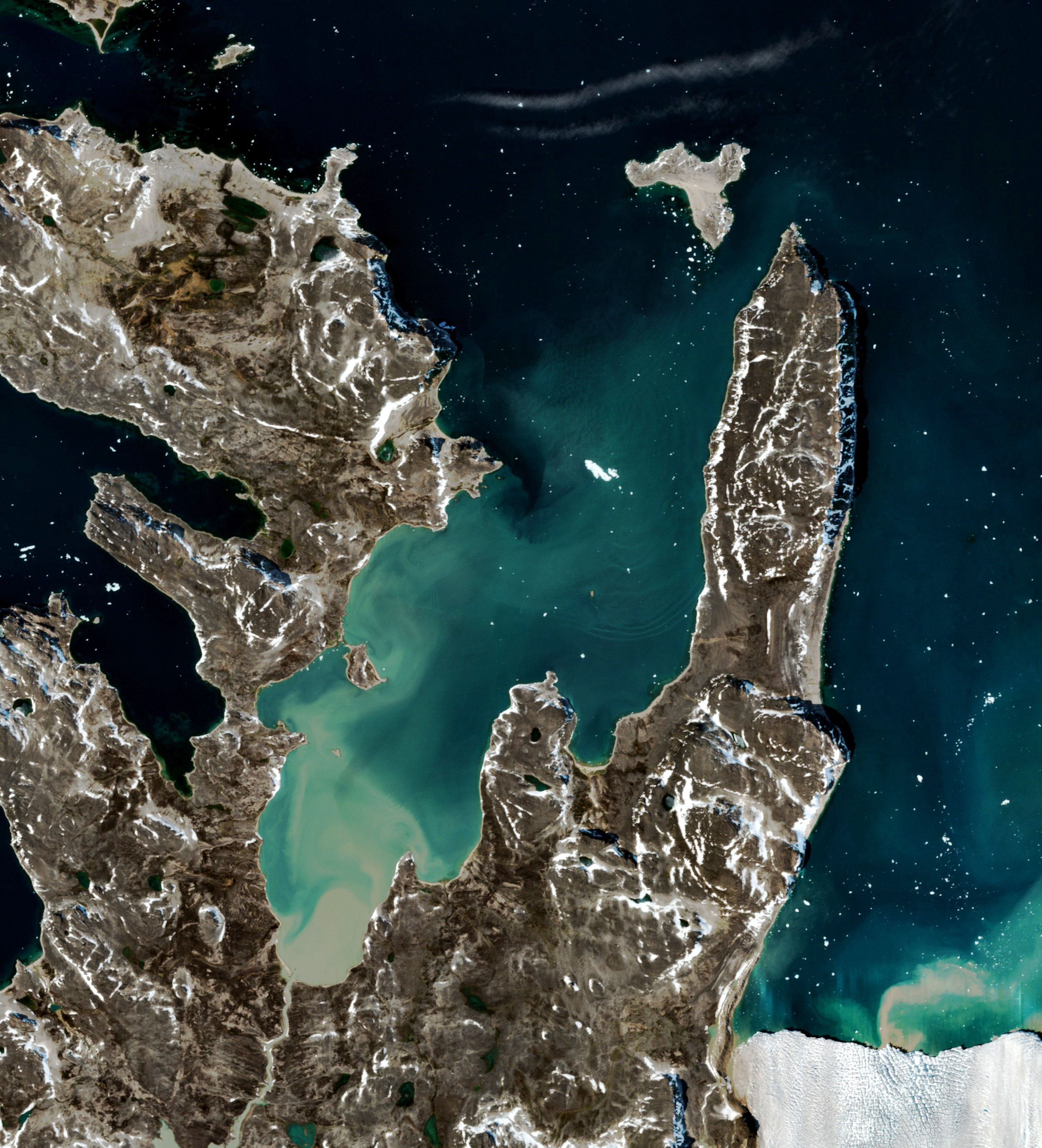
- Sentinel-2 image (2020)

- Location within Svalbard
- Coordinates: 80°18′30″N 24°39′18″E

Finn Malmgren Fjord (Norwegian: Finn Malmgrenfjorden) is a fjord in Orvin Land at Nordaustlandet, Svalbard, between Glenhalvøya and Bergstrømodden. A land tongue of 0.5 kilometers separates the fjord from Adlersparrefjorden. Finn Malmgrenfjorden is named after Arctic explorer Finn Malmgren.
