= Castrénøyane =

Islands east of Chermsideøya, Svalbard

Coordinates: 80.49°N 20.22°E

Castrénøyane is the name given to two small islands, Nordre Castrénøya and Søre Castrénøya (English: Northern and Southern Castrén Island), east of Chermsideøya, Svalbard.

The islands were named after Matthias Alexander Castrén (1813–52), a Finnish linguist and traveller. The islands were visited by Swedish geologist O. M. Torell and Swedish geologist and Arctic explorer Adolf Erik Nordenskiöld in 1861.
