= Vesle Tavleøya =

Island north of Nordaustlandet, Svalbard

Coordinates: 80°49.2′N 20°21.5′E

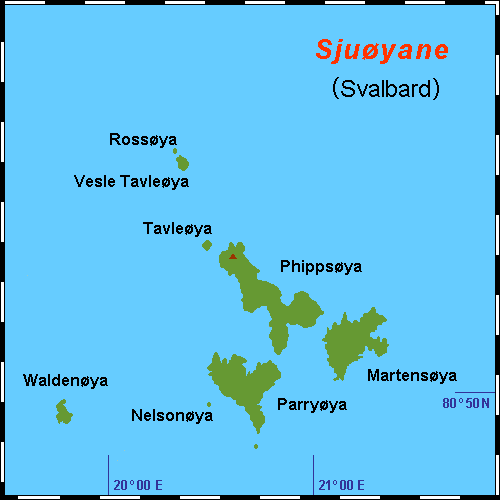
Rossøya is the northernmost part of Sjuøyane

Sjuøyane in relation to Nordaustlandet

Vesle Tavleøya (English: Little Slate Island) is the larger island of the two northernmost of Sjuøyane - the other being Rossøya, north of Nordaustlandet, Svalbard. Vesle Tavleøya is situated some 7 km northeast of Phippsøya, the largest island of the islands, separated by Sjuøyflaket sound.

Latitude: 80° 49' 11.99" N Longitude: 20° 21' 29.99" E
