= Cornelis Giles =

Dutch whaler

Cornelis Giles (in Dutch: Cornelis Cornelisz. Gielis; c. 1675 – 2 July 1722) was a Dutch whaler, navigator, cartographer, and polar explorer.

== Life ==
As a whaler in 1707, Giles traveled north of Nordaustlandet in Svalbard and reached a point farther north of Sjuøyane without encountering ice. A published abstract in the Royal Geographical Society's proceedings later remarked in 1873 that such voyages "have never been equalled [sic] up to the present day".

He then continued his route eastward in open sea and sighted an unknown high land at approximately 80 degrees north—the island of Kvitøya—located about 100 km east of the main Svalbard archipelago. The location appeared on charts as "Giles Land" for a number of years, and the island was not visited again for approximately 170 years due to heavy pack ice in the region.

Over time, "Giles Land" evolved into an enigmatic feature in cartographic records, as uncertainty about its position persisted. Sightings of Kong Karls Land, much farther south, in the mid-19th century were at times wrongly attributed to Giles Land, adding to the confusion surrounding its true location.

Kvitøya was eventually visited for an exploration in 1898, but uncertainty about Giles Land lingered, and as late as 1935 an expedition in the icebreaker Sadko was described in contemporary news reports as seeking a "phantom island" or "alleged island" of Giles Island.

== Death and legacy ==
Giles died at sea on 2 July 1722, and was buried in Den Helder on 19 August. The Gilessundet inlet in Svalbard was named in his honor.
