= Martensøya =

Island in Svalbard, Norway

Coordinates: 80°40.5′N 21°13′E

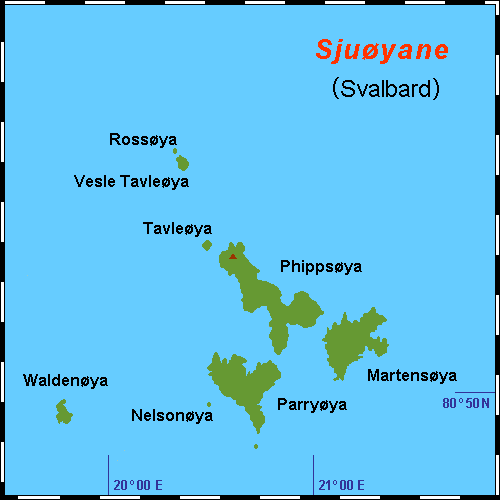
Sjuøyane

Martensøya (anglicized as Martens Island) is the easternmost island of Sjuøyane, which lies north of Nordaustlandet, part of the Svalbard archipelago in Arctic Norway. The island is named after the German physician Friderich Martens, who visited Spitsbergen in 1671. Total area 19 km^{2}. Highest point: Sølvberget, 405 m.a.s.l..
