= Rossøya =

Island in Svalbard, Norway

Coordinates: 80°49.5′N 20°20.5′E

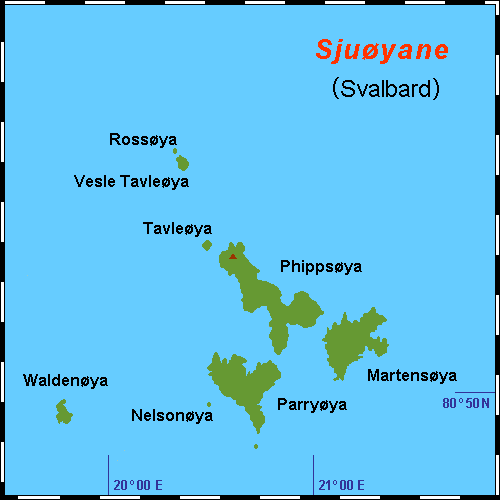
Rossøya is the northernmost part of Sjuøyane

Sjuøyane in relation to Nordaustlandet

Rossøya, sometimes referred to as Ross Island in English, is an island located in the Arctic Ocean. It is a part of Sjuøyane, a group of islands in the Svalbard archipelago, some 20 km north of the coast of Nordaustlandet, Svalbard in Arctic Norway. Rossøya is located 100 m north-northwest of the somewhat larger island Vesle Tavleøya. The northern point of Rossøya, at 80° 49′ 44.41″ North, is the northernmost point in Svalbard, and thereby also in the Kingdom of Norway. The distance to the North Pole is 1024.3 kilometers (637 mi / 553 nm), to Nordkapp on the Norwegian mainland 1084 km and to Pysen, off the southern tip of mainland Norway, 2580 km.

Some sources describe Rossøya as the northernmost point of Europe, but this requires that Franz Josef Land be considered part of Asia, since Cape Fligely on Rudolf Island, Russia, is located at 81° 48′ 24″ North, which is 109 km closer to the North Pole.

The island is named after James Clark Ross (1800–1862), a British explorer who was part of William Edward Parry's 1827 expedition with HMS Hecla to reach the North Pole. After passing by Sjuøyane and Rossøya, the expedition was forced to give up, after getting stuck in the ice. However, the expedition set a new record as the expedition that had reached the furthest north at the time. The island may have been sighted as early as 1618, along with the rest of Sjuøyane, by an Enkhuizen whaler. However, the island was marked on a map as early as 1663 by Hendrick Doncker. This was later followed by cartographers such as Pieter Goos, Cornelis Giles and Outger Rep. The island was included in the Nordaust-Svalbard Nature Reserve since 1 January 1973.

Accessibility by ship can be difficult due to ice conditions, but the island is more affected by the Gulf Stream than more southeasterly parts of Svalbard. The island is slightly greenish, due to the plant Cochleraria groenlandica, that thrives due to the natural fertilizing from the birds' excrements. The most common bird is the little auk, though other common species include the Atlantic puffin and Brünnich's guillemot. Birds arrive in April–May, and stay during the summer. The only mammal is the polar bear, which is most commonly found during the winter, when it can use the ice to cross to the island.
