= Nordkapp (Nordaustlandet) =

Headland of Nordaustlandet, Svalbard

Coordinates: 80°32.1′N 19°59.7′E

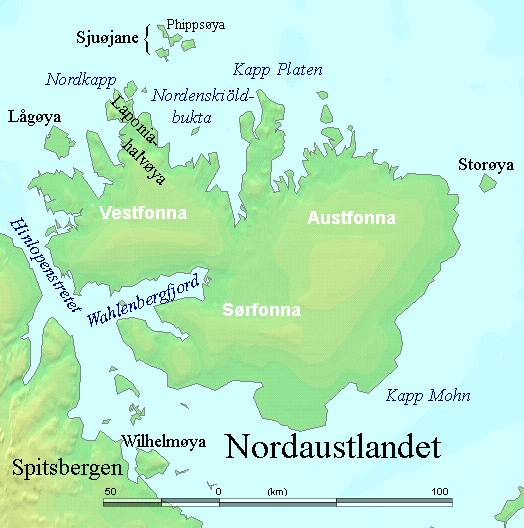
Nordkapp is located on the northern tip of Chermsideøya.

Nordkapp (North Cape) is the northernmost point of Nordaustlandet, Svalbard in Arctic Norway, located at the northern extreme of Chermsideøya, off the coast of Nordaustlandet.
