= Duvefjorden =

Fjord

Coordinates: 80°22′N 23°40′E

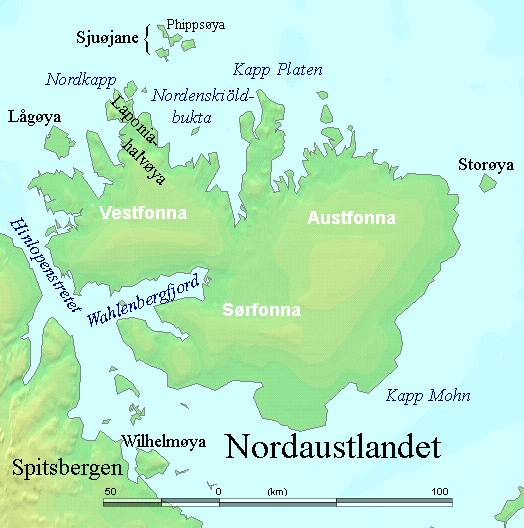
Duvefjorden is located at the northern side of Nordaustlandet.

Duvefjorden is a fjord at the northern side of Nordaustlandet, Svalbard. The fjord has a length of about 35 kilometres (22 mi) and a width of 12 to 13 km. Former names of the fjord include Baye du Pigeon, Dove Bay, Tauben Bai and Duiven-baai.
