= Sjuøyane =

Archipelago in Svalbard, Norway

Coordinates: 80°41′N 20°57′E

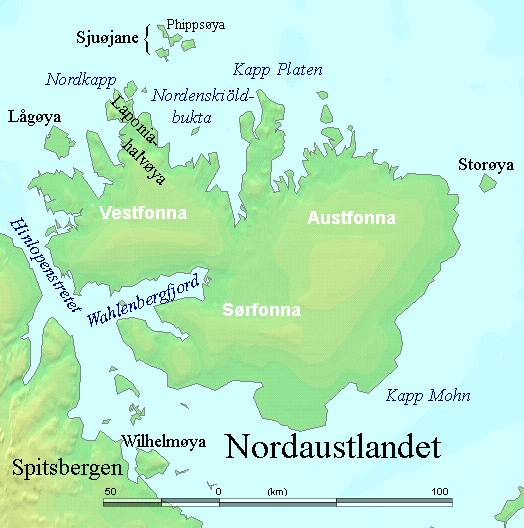
Area map

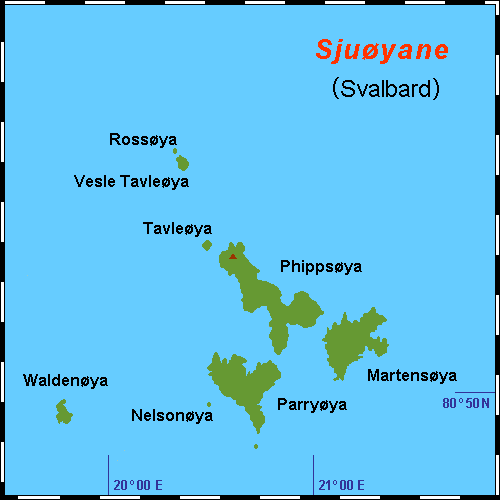
Sjuøyane

Sjuøyane (English: Seven Islands) is the northernmost part of the Svalbard archipelago north of mainland Norway, and some 20 km north of the eastern major island Nordaustlandet. The islands are the northernmost landmass reachable by normal means, being 1024.3 kilometers (637 mi / 553 nm) south of the North Pole. In comparison, Robert Falcon Scott started his ill-fated Terra Nova Expedition 1374 km (742 Nm) from the South Pole. Many of the islands are named after English explorers, most notably Captain Nelson.

== Geography ==
As the name implies, this is regarded as a group of seven islands (including several islets and skerries), of which the three larger ones are:

- Phippsøya
- Martensøya
- Parryøya

And the four smaller:

- Nelsonøya
- Waldenøya
- Tavleøya
- Vesle Tavleøya with Rossøya

Rossøya, more a skerry than an island, is at 80°49’44" the northernmost land of Svalbard and thus of Norway. Ice conditions are often difficult, but they are often earlier accessible than other parts of Svalbard further southeast because of the influence of the last drops of the Gulf Stream. Sjuøyane belong to the Nordaust-Svalbard Nature Reserve.

== History ==
Sjuøyane were first marked on a map by the Dutchman Hendrick Doncker (1663). Pieter Goos (1666) and other cartographers soon followed. Cornelis Giles and Outger Rep (c. 1710) were the first to put the islands in their correct position. The islands may have been sighted as early as 1618, as an Enkhuizen whaler is said to have seen the islands this year. As map-makers often lagged years behind the actual discoveries of the archipelago, this claim may very well be true, although evidence is lacking.

== See also ==
- List of islands in the Arctic Ocean
- List of islands of Norway
- Queen Victoria Sea
