= Orvin Land =

Land area of the northeastern part of Nordaustlandet, Svalbard

Coordinates: 80°06′15″N 25°24′30″E

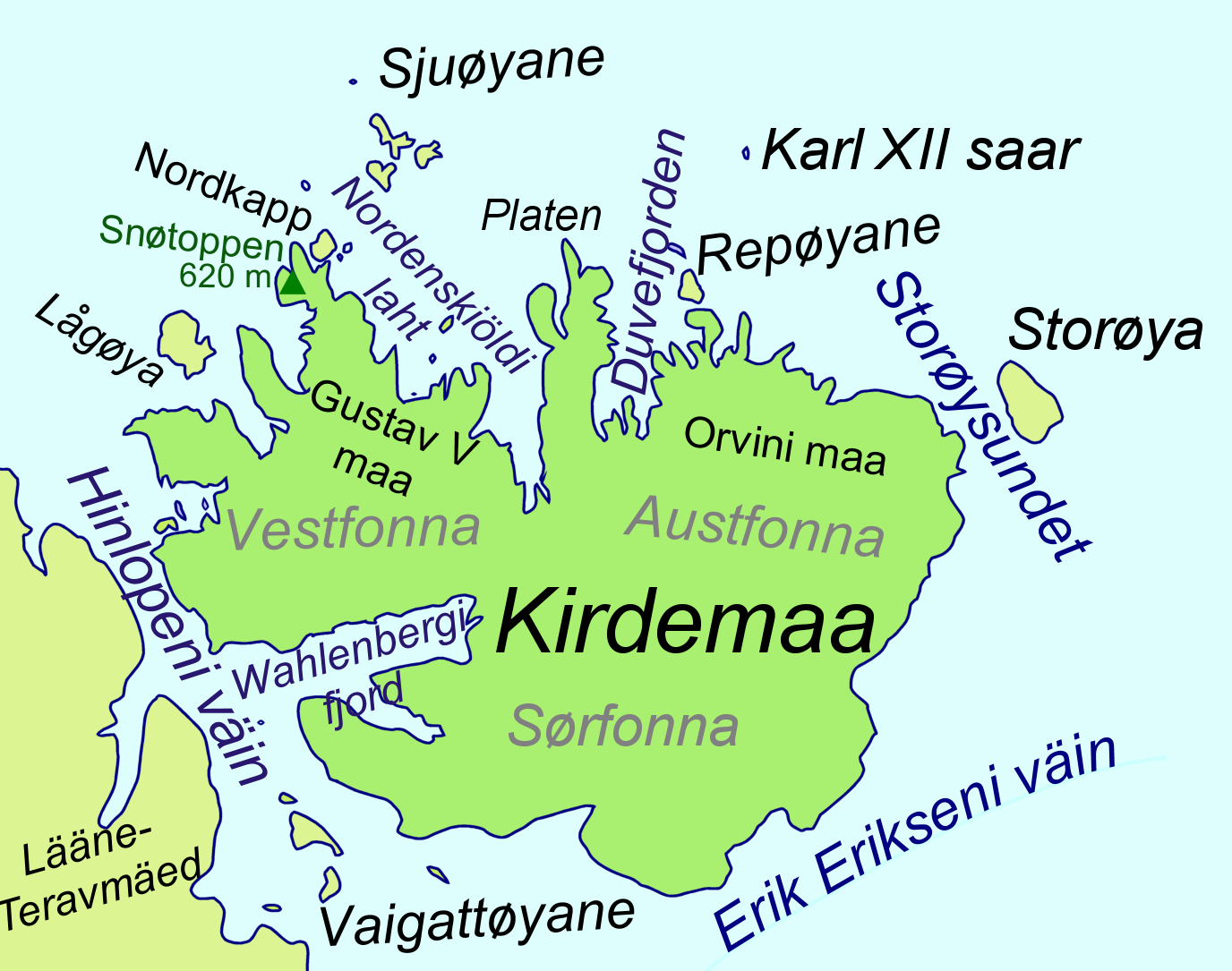
Orvin Land is located at the northeastern part of Nordaustlandet.

Orvin Land is the land area of the northeastern part of Nordaustlandet, Svalbard, east of Duvefjorden, including the lower part of Austfonna. The area is named after geologist Anders Kristian Orvin. Orvin Land is bordered by Prins Oscars Land to the east and Austfonna to the south.
